This is a list of notable alumni from the University of Cambridge, featuring members of the University of Cambridge segregated in accordance with their fields of achievement. The individual must have either studied at the university (although they may not necessarily have taken a degree), or worked at the university in an academic capacity; others have held fellowships at one of the university's colleges. Honorary fellows or those awarded an honorary degree are not included and neither are non-executive chancellors. Lecturers without long-term posts at the university also do not feature, although official visiting fellows and visiting professors do.

The list has been divided into categories indicating the field of activity in which people have become well known. Many of the university's alumni/ae have attained a level of distinction in more than one field. These individuals may appear under two categories.

Cantabrigians is a term for members of the university derived from its Latin name Cantabrigia, a medieval Latin name for Cambridge.

Politics and royalty

Monarchs

 Charles Vyner Brooke, Rajah of Sarawak (Magdalene)
 Dina al-Hussein of Jordan (Princess Dina Abdul Hamid after 1957 divorce) (Girton)
 Edward VII of the United Kingdom (Trinity)
 George VI of the United Kingdom (Trinity)
 Charles III of the United Kingdom (Trinity)
 Kumar Shri Ranjitsinhji, Maharaja Jam Sahib of Nawanagar, India (Trinity)
 Letsie III of Lesotho (Wolfson)
 Margrethe II of Denmark (Girton)
 Mutesa II of Buganda, Kabaka of Buganda (Magdalene)
 Muwenda Mutebi II, Kabaka of Buganda (Magdalene)
 Peter II of Yugoslavia (Clare)
 Sofía, Queen Consort of Spain (Fitzwilliam)

Royalty

 Prince Andrew of Yugoslavia (Clare)
 Prince Albert Victor, Duke of Clarence and Avondale (Trinity)
 Prince Asfa-Wossen Asserate of Ethiopia (Magdalene)
 Prince Edward, Duke of Edinburgh (Jesus)
 Fra' Matthew Festing, Prince and Grand Master of the Order of Malta (St John's)
 Prince Ra'ad bin Zeid of Iraq (Christ's)
 Princess Rahma bint Hassan of Jordan (Trinity)
 Prince Rashid bin Hassan of Jordan (Caius)
Sao Hkun Hkio, Saopha of Mongmit, 4th Foreign Minister of Myanmar
 Prince Richard, Duke of Gloucester (Magdalene)
 Shaikh Salman bin Hamad bin Isa Al-Khalifa, Crown Prince of Bahrain (Queens')
 Princess Sarvath El Hassan of Jordan (unknown)
 Princess Takamado of Japan (Girton)
 Prince Tomislav of Yugoslavia (Clare)
 Prince Tunku Abdul Rahman of Kedah (St Catharine's)
 Prince Henry, Duke of Gloucester (Trinity)
 Prince William, Prince of Wales (without college membership, de facto St John's)
 Prince William of Gloucester (Magdalene)
 Prince William, Duke of Gloucester and Edinburgh (Trinity)
 Prince Zeid bin Ra'ad of Iraq (Christ's)

Diplomats

Viceroys

Clement Francis Cornwall (Trinity/Magdalene), Lieutenant Governor of British Columbia (1881–1887)
Charles Cornwallis (Clare), Governor-General of India (1786–1793)
Freeman Freeman-Thomas, 1st Marquess of Willingdon (Trinity), 13th Governor General of Canada (1926–1931)
Sir Robert George Howe (St Catharine's), Governor General of the Sudan (1947–1955)
David Lloyd Johnston (Trinity Hall), 28th Governor General of Canada (2010–)
Sir William Manning (Fitzwilliam), Governor of Jamaica (1913–1918) and Governor of Ceylon (1918–1925)
Louis Mountbatten (Christ's), last Viceroy of India (1947); first Governor General of India (1947–1948)
Sarojini Naidu (Girton), first woman to become the President of the Indian National Congress (1925) and Governor of Uttar Pradesh (1947–1949)
Shenton Thomas (Queens'), last Governor of the Straits Settlements (1934-1942, 1945–1946) and Governor of the Gold Coast (1932-1934)
Vere Ponsonby, 9th Earl of Bessborough (Trinity), 14th Governor-General of Canada (1931–1935)
John Winthrop (Trinity), founder and first Governor of Massachusetts (1630–1648)

Ambassadors

 Leigh Turner (Downing), UK Ambassador to Austria (2016-)  
 Janet Douglas (St Catherine's), UK High Commissioner to Barbados (2017-)
 Caroline Wilson (Downing), UK Ambassador to China (2020-)
 Antony Stokes (Queens'), UK Ambassador to Cuba (2016-)
 Theresa Bubbear (Girton), UK Ambassador to Estonia (2016-)
 Paul Madden (Caius), UK Ambassador to Japan (2017-)
 Nicholas Hopton (Magdalene), UK Ambassador to Libya (2019-)
 Laura Clarke, UK High Commissioner to New Zealand (2018-)
 Colin Crooks, UK Ambassador to North Korea (2018-)
 Sir Laurie Bristow (Trinity), UK Ambassador to Russia (2016-2020)
 Nigel Baker (Caius), UK Ambassador to Slovakia (2020-)
 Jane Owen (Trinity), UK Ambassador to Switzerland (2018-)
 Brian Davidson (Trinity), UK Ambassador to Thailand (2016-)
 Karen Pierce (Girton), UK Ambassador to the United States (2020-)
Hugh Elliott (Trinity), UK Ambassador to Spain (2019-)
Jacqueline Perkins, UK Ambassador to Belarus (2019-)

Heads of state and heads of government
Jawaharlal Nehru (Trinity), first Prime Minister of India
Dr Manmohan Singh (St John's College), Prime Minister of India
Oliver Cromwell (Sidney Sussex), first Lord Protector
Lee Kuan Yew (Fitzwilliam),  Prime Minister of Singapore 1959-1990
Lee Hsien Loong (Trinity),  Prime Minister of Singapore 2004-Present
Dudley Senanayake (Corpus Christi), Prime Minister of Ceylon 1952-1952, 1960, 1965-1970
John Kotelawala (Christ's), Prime Minister of Ceylon 1953-1956

British Prime Ministers

Robert Walpole (King's), first Prime Minister 1721–1742
Thomas Pelham-Holles, 1st Duke of Newcastle (Clare), Prime Minister 1754–1756, 1757–1762
Charles Watson-Wentworth, 2nd Marquess of Rockingham (St John's), Prime Minister 1765–1766, 1782
Augustus FitzRoy, 3rd Duke of Grafton (Peterhouse), Prime Minister 1768–1770
William Pitt the Younger (Pembroke), Prime Minister 1783–1801, 1804–1806
Spencer Perceval (Trinity), Prime Minister 1809–1812
Frederick John Robinson, 1st Viscount Goderich (St John's), Prime Minister 1827–1828
Charles Grey, 2nd Earl Grey (Trinity), Prime Minister 1830–1834
William Lamb, 2nd Viscount Melbourne (Trinity), Prime Minister 1834, 1835–1841
George Hamilton-Gordon, 4th Earl of Aberdeen (St John's), Prime Minister 1852–1855
Henry John Temple, 3rd Viscount Palmerston (St John's), Prime Minister 1855–1858, 1859–1865
Arthur Balfour (Trinity), Prime Minister 1902–1905
Henry Campbell-Bannerman (Trinity), Prime Minister 1905–1908
Stanley Baldwin (Trinity), Prime Minister 1923–1924, 1924–1929, 1935–1937

Signatories of the American Declaration of Independence

Thomas Lynch, Jr. (Caius)
Arthur Middleton (Trinity Hall)
Thomas Nelson, Jr. (Christ's)

Soviet spies
Known:

Anthony Blunt (Trinity)
Guy Burgess (Trinity)
John Cairncross (Trinity)
Donald Maclean (Trinity Hall)
Alan Nunn May (Trinity Hall)
Kim Philby (Trinity)
Michael Whitney Straight (Trinity)

Suspected:
Victor Rothschild (Trinity)
(for other suspects, see Cambridge Five)

Other political figures

A–D

Diane Abbott (Newnham), British shadow cabinet member and Labour Party leadership contender
Colin Forbes Adam (King's), civil servant in the Indian Imperial Civil Service
Aitzaz Ahsan (Downing), Interior Minister of Pakistan (1988–1990)
Mani Shankar Aiyar (Trinity Hall), Indian Minister of Panchayati Raj (2004–2009)
Augustus Molade Akiwumi (Fitzwilliam), Speaker of the Parliament of Ghana (1958–1960)
Awn Shawkat Al-Khasawneh (Queens'), Jordanian Foreign Minister (1980–1990), Royal State Adviser on International Law
Musa Alami (unknown), Palestinian nationalist, major contributor to the White Paper of 1939
Choudhary Rahmat Ali (Emmanuel), Pakistani independence leader, credited with inventing the name "Pakistan"
Jorge Arreaza, Venezuelan Minister of Foreign Affairs (2017–), former Vice President (2013–2016)
Gilberto Arias (Hughes Hall), Ambassador of Panama to the United Kingdom (2009-2011)
Sri Aurobindo (King's), Member of the Indian National Congress and independence leader
Nathaniel Bacon (Sidney Sussex), early American rebel, instigator of Bacon's Rebellion of 1676
Steve Barclay (Peterhouse), Conservative MP and Secretary of State for Exiting the European Union (2018–)
Joseph Baptista (Fitzwilliam), founder of the Indian Home Rule Movement (1916) and Mayor of Bombay (1925–1926)
Johan Baverbrant (St Edmund's), Swedish representative on the Council of Europe
Chris Bentley (Wolfson), Minister of Aboriginal Affairs in Ontario (2010–)
Augustine Birrell (Trinity Hall), British Chief Secretary for Ireland (1907–1916)
Hans Blix (Trinity Hall), UN weapons inspector, Swedish Foreign Minister (1978–1979)
Richard Blumenthal (Trinity), US Senator from Connecticut (2011–)
Maria Böhmer (unknown), current Minister of State in the German Chancellery
Subhas Chandra Bose (Fitzwilliam), President of the Indian National Congress (1938–1939) and leader of the Indian National Army
William Bridgeman, 1st Viscount Bridgeman, British Home Secretary (1922–1924)
Leon Brittan (Trinity), British Home Secretary (1983–1985) and vice-president of the European Commission (1999)
Annette Brooke (Hughes Hall), Liberal Democrats MP for Mid Dorset and North Poole
Andy Burnham (Fitzwilliam), British Health Secretary (2009–2010) and Labour Party leadership contender
Rab Butler (Pembroke), British Deputy Prime Minister (1962–1963), Home Secretary (1957–1962), Foreign Secretary (1963–1964) and Chancellor of the Exchequer (1951–1955)
Jerzy Buzek (unknown), President of the European Parliament (2009-2012)
P. K. van der Byl (Pembroke), Rhodesian Foreign Minister (1974–1979)
Vince Cable (Fitzwilliam), Deputy Leader of the Liberal Democrats (2006-2010) and Business Secretary (2010-2015)
Alastair Campbell (Caius), Press Secretary and Director of Communications and Strategy under Tony Blair
Robert Carr (Caius), British Home Secretary (1972–1974)
Fernando María Castiella y Maíz (unknown), Spanish Foreign Minister (1957–1969)
William Cecil (St John's), Chief adviser to Queen Elizabeth I, Secretary of State (1550–1553 and 1558–1572)
Austen Chamberlain (Trinity), British Chancellor of the Exchequer (1903–1905, 1919–1921), Secretary of State for India (1915–1917), Leader of the Conservative Party (1921–1922), Foreign Secretary (1924–1929) and Nobel Peace Prize winner (1925)
Somnath Chatterjee (Jesus), Speaker of the Lok Sabha in the Indian Government (2004–2009)
Erskine Childers (Trinity), Irish independence leader, Director of Publicity for the First Irish Parliament (1919–1922)
Charles Clarke (King's), British Home Secretary (2004–2006) and Education Secretary (2002–2004)
Kenneth Clarke (Caius), British Chancellor of the Exchequer (1993–1997), Home Secretary (1992–1993), Education Secretary (1990–1992) and Health Secretary (1988–1990)
Thomas Clarkson (St John's), slavery abolitionist
Nick Clegg (Robinson), Leader of the British Liberal Democrats (2007-2015) and Deputy Prime Minister (2010-2015)
Paul Clement (Darwin), Solicitor General of the United States (2004–2008)
Jo Cox (Pembroke), Member of Parliament for the Batley and Spen constituency from May 2015 until her murder in June 2016
Robert Crewe-Milnes, 1st Marquess of Crewe, British Secretary of State for India (1910–1911, 1911–1915), Ambassador to France (1922–1928) and Secretary of State for War (1931)
Hugh Dalton (King's), Chairman of the Labour Party (1936–1937) and British Chancellor of the Exchequer (1945–1947)
Sir C. D. Deshmukh (Jesus), Finance Minister in the Indian Government (1951–1957)
Robert Devereux, 2nd Earl of Essex (Trinity), favourite of and adviser to Queen Elizabeth I, Earl Marshal (1597–1601)
Gamini Dissanayake (Wolfson), Sri Lankan Leader of the Opposition (1994)
Lawrence Dundas, 2nd Marquess of Zetland (Trinity), British Secretary of State for India (1935–1940)

E–M

Abba Eban (Queens'/Pembroke), Israeli Deputy Prime Minister (1963–1966), Education Minister (1960–1963) and Foreign Minister (1966–1974)
James Chuter Ede (Christ's), British Home Secretary (1945–1951)
Steven Engel (unknown), United States Assistant Attorney General for the Office of Legal Counsel under the Trump Administration (2017–present)
Femi Fani-Kayode (Pembroke), Nigerian Minister of Aviation (2006–2007) and Special Assistant to the President (2003–2006)
Remi Fani-Kayode (Downing), Nigerian Minister for Local Government Affairs (1963–1966)
Kate Forbes (Selwyn), Scottish Cabinet Secretary for Finance (2020–present)
Peter Fragiskatos Canadian MP
Karen-Christine Friele (unknown), Norwegian gay rights activist, leader of Forbundet av 1948 (1966–1971)
Rahul Gandhi (Trinity), General Secretary of the Indian National Congress (2004–)
Michael Gau (Hughes Hall), Vice Chairman of Aviation Safety Council of the Republic of China
Sir John Gilmour, 2nd Baronet (Trinity Hall), British Home Secretary (1932–1935)
Jarosław Gowin, former Deputy Prime Minister of Poland
Chris Grayling (Sidney Sussex), Lord High Chancellor of Great Britain (2012–2015) and Transport Minister (2016–2019)
Nick Griffin (Downing), Leader of the British National Party (1999–)
Matt Hancock (Christ's), British Health Secretary (2018–2021)
William Hare, 5th Earl of Listowel (Magdalene), the last British Secretary of State for India (1947) and the last Governor-General of Ghana (1957–1960)
William Harcourt (Trinity), British Home Secretary (1880–1885), Chancellor of the Exchequer (1892–1895) and Leader of the Opposition (1896–1898)
John Healey (Christ's), British MP
Francis Higginson (Jesus), first Minister of Salem, Massachusetts (1629–1630)
Geoff Hoon (Jesus), British Secretary of State for Defence (1999–2005) and Secretary of State for Transport (2008–2009)
Michael Howard (Peterhouse), Leader of the Conservative Party (2003–2005), British Home Secretary (1993–1997)
Geoffrey Howe (Trinity Hall), British Chancellor of the Exchequer (1979–1983), Foreign Secretary (1983–1989), and Leader of the House of Commons and Deputy Prime Minister (1989–1990)
Douglas Hurd (Trinity), British Home Secretary (1985–1989) and Foreign Secretary (1989–1995)
Michael Ignatieff (King's), Leader of the Liberal Party of Canada (2008–2011)
Vane Ivanović (Peterhouse), co-founder of the European Movement (1947), pro-Yugoslavia activist
Vladeta Janković (unknown), co-founder and Deputy President of Democratic Party of Serbia (1992), Yugoslav Ambassador to the United Kingdom
Vuk Jeremić (Queens'), Foreign Minister in the Government of Serbia (2007–2012)
Michael Johnson (unknown), Member of the Australian House of Representatives (2001–2010)
Suematsu Kenchō (St John's), Japanese Home Minister (1900–1901) and Minister of Communication (1898)
Norman Lamont (Fitzwilliam), British Chancellor of the Exchequer (1990–1993)
John Lehman (Caius), US Secretary of the Navy (1981–1987)
Brian Lenihan Jnr (Sidney Sussex), Irish Justice Minister (2007–2008) and Finance Minister (2008–2011)
Alan Leong (Hughes Hall), Leader of the Civic Party of Hong Kong (2011–)
Arthur Li (unknown), Member of the Executive Council of Hong Kong; Hong Kong Secretary for Education and Manpower (2002–2007)
Sir David Li (Selwyn), Member of the Legislative Council of Hong Kong and former member of the Executive Council of Hong Kong
David Lidington (Sidney Sussex), Conservative MP and Chancellor of the Duchy of Lancaster (2018–2019)
Peter Lilley (Clare), British Secretary of State for Trade and Industry (1990–1992) and Secretary of State for Social Security (1992–1997)
Gwilym Lloyd George (Jesus), British Home Secretary (1954–1957) and younger son of David Lloyd George
Selwyn Lloyd (Magdalene), British Foreign Secretary (1955–1960), Chancellor of the Exchequer (1960–1962), and Speaker of the House of Commons (1971–1976)
Roy MacLaren (St Catharine's), Canadian Minister of National Revenue (1984–1985) and Minister of International Trade (1993–1996)
Iain Macleod (Caius), British Chancellor of the Exchequer (1970)
Lord Mark Malloch Brown (Magdalene), Minister of State in the Foreign and Commonwealth Office, and previously United Nations Deputy Secretary-General
Inagaki Manjirō (Caius), Japan's first deputy Minister Resident to the Kingdom of Siam on March 31, 1897; appointed Minister Plenipotentiary on 19 November 1899; envoy extraordinary and Minister Plenipotentiary in 1903; he continued in that role until July 1907 when he was transferred to Madrid, Spain, where he died of illness in 1908
Allama Mashriqi (Christ's), founder of the Khaksar movement (1930)
Francis Maude, (Corpus Christi), Chairman of the Conservative Party (2005–2007)
John McCallum (Queens'), Canadian Minister of National Defence (2002–2003) and Minister of National Revenue (2004–2006)
Reginald McKenna (Trinity Hall), British Home Secretary (1911–1915) and Chancellor of the Exchequer (1915–1916)
David Mellor (Christ's), British Conservative MP and Chief Secretary to the Treasury (1990–1992)
Andrew Mitchell (Jesus), British Secretary of State for International Development (2010–2012)
Edwin Montagu (Trinity), British Secretary of State for India (1917–1922)
Paula Marcela Moreno Zapata (Hughes Hall), Minister of Culture, Colombia; Hubert H. Humphrey Fellow, MIT
Andrew Murrison (Hughes Hall), Conservative Party MP for Westbury and former Minister of State for Northern Ireland
Paul Magnette, President of the Socialist Party of Belgium and former Minister-President of Wallonia
R. M. Muzumdar, IOFS officer. He was the second Indian Director General of the Indian Ordnance Factories.

N–Z

Marty Natalegawa (Corpus Christi), Foreign Minister in the Indonesian Government (2009–)
Philip Noel-Baker (King's), British Commonwealth Secretary (1947–1950), Chair of the Labour Party (1946–1947) and Nobel Peace Prize winner (1959)
Simeon Nyachae (Churchill), Kenyan presidential candidate (2002)
David Owen (Sidney Sussex), co-founder and leader of the Social Democratic Party (1983–1987 & 1988–1990), British Foreign Secretary (1977–1979)
Charles Stewart Parnell (Magdalene), Leader of the Irish Nationalist Party (1882–1891)
Matthew Parris (Clare), British political analyst, Member of Parliament for West Derbyshire (1979–1986)
Sir Emyr Jones Parry (St Catharine's), British Permanent Representative to the United Nations (2003–2007) and NATO (2001–2003)
Frederick Pethick-Lawrence (Trinity), British Leader of the Opposition (1942) and Secretary of State for India and Burma (1945–1947)
Michael Portillo (Peterhouse), British Defence Secretary (1995–1997) and Employment Secretary (1994–1995)
Enoch Powell (Trinity), British Minister of Health (1960–1963) and Financial Secretary to the Treasury (1957–1958)
Francis Pym (Magdalene), British Foreign Secretary (1982–1983) and Leader of the House of Commons (1981–1982)
Shah Mehmood Qureshi (Corpus Christi), Foreign Minister in the Pakistani Government (2008–)
Dominic Raab (Jesus), British Secretary of State for Exiting the European Union (July–November 2018) and Foreign Secretary (2019–2021) Deputy Prime Minister of the United Kingdom (2021-Present)
Sir Benegal Rama Rau (King's), Indian Ambassador to Japan (1947–1948) and the United States (1948–1949)
Geoffrey Robinson (Clare), Paymaster General in the British Government (1997–1999)
Gábor Scheiring (Hughes Hall), economist and Member of the Hungarian National Assembly
Tharman Shanmugaratnam (Wolfson), Singapore's Education Minister (2003–2008) and Finance Minister (2007–)
Kamalesh Sharma (King's), Secretary General of the Commonwealth of Nations (2008–)
Peter Shore (King's), Secretary of State for Trade (1974–1976) and Secretary of State for the Environment (1976–1979)
Shahid Aziz Siddiqi (Wolfson), Federal Secretary in the Government of Pakistan (1997–2000)
Arun Singh (St Catharine's), Minister of State for Defence in the Government of India (1984–1988)
Chris Smith (Pembroke), British Secretary of State for Culture, Media and Sport (1997–2001)
Gavin Strang (Churchill), British Transport Minister (1997–1998)
Sir John Stuttard (Churchill), Lord Mayor of London 2006/7
Szeming Sze (Christ's), Chinese representative at the foundation of the United Nations (1945) and co-founder of the World Health Organization (1948)
Linda Taylor, executive director of the United Nations Office of Administration of Justice (OAJ)
Sir George Trevelyan, 2nd Baronet (Trinity), Secretary of State for Scotland (1886) and Ireland (1882–1884)
Christopher Tugendhat (Caius), vice-president of the European Commission (1981–1985)
Andrew Turnbull, Baron Turnbull (Christ's), Cabinet Secretary and Head of the Civil Service
Tin Tut (unknown), Minister of Finance in the Government of Myanmar (1946–1947)
Tom Udall (Downing), US Senator from New Mexico (2009–)
Jim Wallace (Downing), Leader of the Scottish Liberal Democrats (1992–2005) and Deputy First Minister of Scotland (1999–2005)
Francis Walsingham (King's), Principal Secretary to Elizabeth I of England (1573–1590), "Spymaster"
William Whitelaw (Trinity), British Home Secretary (1979–1983) and Deputy Leader of the Conservative Party (1975–1991)
William Wilberforce (St John's), slavery abolitionist
Roger Williams (Pembroke), founder of Rhode Island, advocate of Native Americans
Yeo Bee Yin |Corpus Christi|, Minister of Energy, Science, Technology, Environment and Climate Change (Malaysia)

Clergy and spiritual leaders

Sri Aurobindo (King's)
Richard Bauckham (Clare/Ridley Hall)
Edward White Benson (Trinity)
William Brewster (Peterhouse)
Arthur Buxton (Trinity/Ridley Hall)
Donald Coggan (St John's)
Frederick Cornwallis (Christ's), Archbishop of Canterbury
Thomas Cranmer (Jesus)
Timothy Dudley-Smith (Pembroke/Ridley Hall)
Saint John Fisher (Michaelhouse)
Sir James George Frazer (Trinity)
Edmund Grindal (Christ's), Archbishop of Canterbury
Nicky Gumbel (Trinity)
Anne Hollinghurst (Hughes Hall), Bishop of Aston
Fenton John Anthony Hort (Trinity/Emmanuel)
George Joye (Christ's/Peterhouse)
Nicky Lee (Trinity)
Dick Lucas (Trinity/Ridley Hall)
J. B. Lightfoot (Trinity)
F. D. Maurice (Trinity/Trinity Hall)
Handley Moule (Trinity/Ridley Hall), Bishop of Durham
Michael Nazir-Ali (Ridley Hall/Fitzwilliam), Bishop of Rochester
Mike Ovey (Ridley Hall/Trinity)
Arthur Peacocke (Clare), Templeton Prize winner
William Perkins (Christ's), Puritan theologian
Sogyal Rinpoche (Trinity)
Jonathan Sacks (Caius)
Solomon Schechter (unknown)
John Sentamu (Selwyn/Ridley Hall)
David Sheppard (Trinity Hall/Ridley Hall), Bishop of Liverpool
Shimun XXI Eshai (Westcott House)
William Robertson Smith (Christ's)
John Stott (Trinity/Ridley Hall)
Eckhart Tolle (Caius)
William Tyndale (unknown)
Terry Waite (Trinity Hall)
Brooke Foss Westcott (Trinity)
Philip William Wheeldon (OBE), Bishop of Whitby and Bishop of Kimberley and Kuruman (Clifton/Downing)
William Whewell (Trinity)
 Archbishop John Whitgift (Queens'/Pembroke/Trinity)
Roger Williams (Pembroke)
Richard Williamson (Clare)

Archbishops of Canterbury

Thomas Langton (Clare/Pembroke), 1501-1501
Thomas Cranmer (Jesus), 1533-1555
Matthew Parker (Corpus), 1559-1575
Edmund Grindal (Christ's), 1576-1583
John Whitgift (Queen's/Pembroke/Peterhouse), 1583-1604
Richard Bancroft (Christ's/Jesus), 1604-1610
William Sancroft (Emmanuel), 1677-1690
John Tillotson (Clare), 1691-1694
Thomas Tenison (Corpus), 1696-1715
Thomas Herring (Jesus), 1747-1757
Matthew Hutton (Jesus), 1757-1758
Frederick Cornwallis (Christ's), 1768-1783
Charles Manners-Sutton (Emmanuel), 1805-1828
John Bird Sumner (King's), 1848-1862
Edward White Benson (Trinity), 1883-1896
Michael Ramsey (Magdalene), 1961-1974
Donald Coggan (St John's), 1974-1980
Robert Runcie (Trinity Hall), 1980-1991
Rowan Williams (Christ's/Clare), 2002-2012
Justin Welby (Trinity), 2013-

Literature

Fiction writers

A–G

Peter Ackroyd (Clare)
Douglas Adams (St John's)
Sir Kingsley Amis (Peterhouse), Booker Prize winner
Mulk Raj Anand (unknown)
Kwame Anthony Appiah (Clare)
Martin Armstrong (Pembroke)
John Bale (Jesus)
J. G. Ballard (King's)
Catherine Banner (Fitzwilliam)
David Benedictus (Churchill)
Gregory Benford (Jesus)
Sir Walter Besant (Christ's)
E. R. Braithwaite (Caius)
Howard Brenton (St Catharine's)
Anita Brookner (Murray Edwards), Booker Prize winner
F. C. Burnand (Trinity)
Samuel Butler (St John's)
Jez Butterworth (St John's)
A. S. Byatt (Newnham), Booker Prize winner
John Byrom (Trinity)
Robert Chartham (unknown)
Erskine Childers (Trinity)
Charles Churchill (St John's)
Jonathan Coe (Trinity)
William Cooper (Christ's)
Michael Crichton (unknown)
Martin Crimp (St Catharine's)
Richard Cumberland (Trinity)
Tsitsi Dangarembga (unknown)
Seamus Deane (Pembroke)
Warwick Deeping (Trinity)
Anita Desai (Girton)
Colin Dexter (Christ's)
Terrance Dicks (Downing)
Emma Donoghue (Girton)
Dame Margaret Drabble (Newnham)
Patricia Duncker (Newnham)
Sebastian Faulks (Emmanuel)
Julian Fellowes (Magdalene)
Ronald Firbank (Trinity Hall)
Tibor Fischer (Peterhouse)
John Fletcher (Corpus Christi)
Giles Foden (Fitzwilliam/St John's)
E. M. Forster (King's)
Michael Frayn (Emmanuel)
William Gerhardie (unknown)
David Gibbins (Corpus Christi)
Simon Gray (Trinity)
Robert Greene (St John's)
Susanna Gregory (Wolfson)

H–M

Lee Hall (Fitzwilliam)
Sir David Hare (Jesus)
Joanne Harris (St Catharine's)
Robert Harris (Selwyn)
Philip Hensher (Jesus)
G. A. Henty (Caius)
Wendy Holden (Girton)
Nick Hornby (Jesus)
Christopher Isherwood (Corpus Christi)
Howard Jacobson (Downing/Selwyn), Booker Prize winner
M. R. James (King's)
Elizabeth Jenkins (Newnham)
Peter Jukes (Queens')
Charles Kingsley (Magdalene)
Nathaniel Lee (Trinity)
Rosamond Lehmann (Girton)
C. S. Lewis (Magdalene)
Malcolm Lowry (St Catharine's)
Gavin Lyall (Pembroke)
Richard Maher (Queens')
Christopher Marlowe (Corpus Christi)
Hisham Matar (Girton)
A. D. Miller (unknown)
A. A. Milne (Trinity)
Nicholas Monsarrat (Trinity)
Richard K. Morgan (Queens')
Dame Iris Murdoch (Newnham), Booker Prize winner
Leo Myers (Trinity)

N–Z

Vladimir Nabokov (Trinity)
Thomas Norton (unknown)
Brian O'Doherty (unknown)
Maggie O'Farrell (Emmanuel)
Joseph O'Neill (Girton)
Lawrence Osborne (Fitzwilliam)
Helen Oyeyemi (Corpus Christi)
Tim Parks (Downing)
Philippa Pearce (Girton)
Sir Max Pemberton (Caius)
Samuel Pepys (Magdalene)
Marie Phillips (Robinson)
Stephen Poliakoff (King's)
John Cowper Powys (Corpus Christi)
J. B. Priestley (Trinity Hall)
Frederic Raphael (St John's), Academy Award winner
Julian Rathbone (Magdalene)
Simon Raven (King's)
Piers Paul Read (St John's)
Amber Reeves (Newnham)
Forrest Reid (Christ's)
Sir Salman Rushdie (King's), Booker Prize winner
Edward Rutherfurd (Caius)
Thomas Shadwell (Caius)
Anthony Shaffer (Trinity)
Sir Peter Shaffer (Trinity), Academy Award winner
Tom Sharpe (Pembroke)
James Shirley (St Catharine's)
Indra Sinha (Pembroke)
Ali Smith (Newnham)
Zadie Smith (King's)
C. P. Snow (Christ's)
Wole Soyinka (Churchill), Nobel Prize winner
George Steiner (Churchill)
Laurence Sterne (Jesus)
Nick Stone (unknown)
William Sutcliffe (Emmanuel)
Graham Swift (Queens'), Booker Prize winner
Netta Syrett (Hughes Hall)
Tom Taylor (Trinity)
William Makepeace Thackeray (Trinity)
Marcel Theroux (Clare)
Matt Thorne (Sidney Sussex)
Frank Tuohy (King's)
Alison Uttley (Hughes Hall)
Leslie Valiant (king's), Turing Award winner
Mario Vargas Llosa (Churchill), Nobel Prize winner
Sir Hugh Walpole (Emmanuel)
Eudora Welty (Peterhouse), Pulitzer Prize winner
Patrick White (King's), Nobel Prize winner
T. H. White (Queens')
James H. Wilkinson (St. John's), Turing Award winner
Raymond Williams (Trinity)
James Wood (Jesus)
Jin Yong (St John's)

Non-fiction writers

A–Z

Nigel Cumberland (Queens')

Poets

A–M

William Alabaster (Trinity)
Sri Aurobindo (King's)
Harivanshrai Bachchan (St Catharine's)
John Bale (Jesus)
Maurice Baring (Trinity)
A. C. Benson (King's/Magdalene)
John Berryman (Clare)
Joseph Brodsky (Clare Hall), Nobel Prize winner
Rupert Brooke (King's)
John Byrom (Trinity)
Lord Byron (Trinity)
Samuel Taylor Coleridge (Jesus)
F. M. Cornford (Trinity)
John Cornford (Trinity)
Abraham Cowley (Trinity)
George Crabbe (Trinity)
Cecil Day-Lewis (unknown), Poet Laureate
John Donne (unknown)
Charles Montagu Doughty (Caius)
John Dryden (Trinity), Poet Laureate
Richard Eberhart (St John's)
D. J. Enright (Downing)
Laurence Eusden (Trinity), Poet Laureate
Michael Field (Newnham)
Edward FitzGerald (Trinity)
Giles Fletcher (Trinity)
George Gascoigne (Trinity)
Alice Goodman (Trinity)
Sir Edmund Gosse (Trinity)
Thomas Gray (Peterhouse/Pembroke)
Thom Gunn (Trinity)
Arthur Hallam (Trinity)
Peter Hausted (Queens')
Hamish Henderson (Downing)
George Herbert (Trinity)
Robert Herrick (St John's)
Geoffrey Hill (Emmanuel)
Philip Hobsbaum (Downing)
David Holbrook (Downing)
John Holloway (Queens')
A. E. Housman (Trinity)
Ted Hughes (Pembroke), Poet Laureate
Sir Muhammad Iqbal (Trinity)
Lawrence Joseph (Magdalene)
Arthur Henry King (unknown)
John Lehmann (Trinity)
Malcolm Lowry (St Catharine's)
Christopher Marlowe (Corpus Christi)
Andrew Marvell (Trinity)
Thomas May (Sidney Sussex)
John Milton (Christ's)
Wendy Mulford (unknown)
Frederic William Henry Myers (Trinity)

N–Z

Victor Benjamin Neuburg (Trinity)
Sylvia Plath (Newnham), Pulitzer Prize winner
J. H. Prynne (Caius)
Kathleen Raine (Girton)
Thomas Randolph (Trinity)
Tom Raworth (King's)
Peter Redgrove (Queens')
Siegfried Sassoon (Clare)
Thomas Shadwell (Caius), Poet Laureate
John Skelton (unknown), Poet Laureate
Christopher Smart (Pembroke)
Edmund Spenser (Pembroke), Poet Laureate
Sir John Suckling (Trinity)
Alfred, Lord Tennyson (Trinity), Poet Laureate
Derick Thomson (unknown)
William Wentworth (Peterhouse)
William Whitehead (Clare), Poet Laureate
John Wilkinson (Jesus)
William Wordsworth (St John's), Poet Laureate
Xu Zhimo (King's)

Literary scholars

M. H. Abrams (Magdalene)
Peter Ackroyd (Clare)
Noel Annan (King's)
Jonathan Bate (St. Catharine's/Trinity Hall)
Mary Beard (Newnham)
Clive Bell (Trinity)
Stanley Bennett (Emmanuel)
Joan Bennett (Girton)
Richard Bentley (St John's/Trinity)
Harold Bloom (Pembroke)
Alain de Botton (Caius)
Henry Bradshaw (King's)
Edward G. Browne (Pembroke)
Nick Clarke (Fitzwilliam)
A. B. Cook (Queens'/Trinity)
F. M. Cornford (Trinity)
Jonathan Culler (Selwyn)
Donald Davie (St Catharine's/Caius)
Simon Digby (Trinity)
Patrick Dixon (King's)
Denis Donoghue (King's)
Gerald Duckworth (Clare)
Terry Eagleton (Trinity/Jesus)
Sir William Empson (Magdalene)
Charles le Gai Eaton (King's)
Henry Louis Gates, Jr. (Clare)
Robert Gittings (Jesus)
Sir Edmund Gosse (Trinity)
Simon Gray (Trinity)
Stephen Greenblatt (Pembroke)
Sir Walter Wilson Greg (Trinity)
Leslie Halliwell (St Catharine's)
Jane Ellen Harrison (Newnham)
Samuel Hartlib (unknown)
Hugh Haughton (Emmanuel)
John Hersey (Clare), Pulitzer Prize winner
Theo Hobson (Hughes Hall)
Vyvyan Holland (Trinity Hall)
Graham Hough (Queens'/Christ's/Darwin)
Christopher Isherwood (Corpus Christi)
Peter Jukes (Queens')
Sir Frank Kermode (King's)
F. R. Leavis (Emmanuel/Downing)
Q. D. Leavis (Girton)
F. L. Lucas (King's)
Colin MacCabe (King's)
Sir Desmond MacCarthy (Trinity)
Ronald Brunlees McKerrow (Trinity)
Marshall McLuhan (Trinity Hall)
Thomas Merton (Clare)
Karl Miller (Downing)
John Mullan (King's/Jesus/Fitzwilliam)
Abioseh Nicol (Christ's)
C. K. Ogden (Magdalene)
Richard Poirier (Downing)
Leonard Potts (Queens')
Sir Arthur Quiller-Couch (Jesus)
Simon Raven (King's)
Forrest Reid (Christ's)
I. A. Richards (Magdalene)
Jo Riley (unknown)
Susan Sellers (Trinity/Lucy Cavendish)
Walter William Skeat (Christ's)
J. B. Steane (Jesus)
George Steiner (Churchill)
Sir Leslie Stephen (Trinity Hall)
Lytton Strachey (Trinity)
Tony Tanner (Jesus/King's)
Claire Tomalin (Newnham)
R. C. Trevelyan (Trinity)
Brian Vickers (Trinity/Downing)
Arthur Waley (King's)
Raymond Williams (Trinity)
J. Dover Wilson (Caius)
James Wood (Jesus)
Leonard Woolf (Trinity)

Travel writers

Maurice Baring (Trinity)
Claudius Buchanan (Queens')
Robert Chartham (unknown)
William Dalrymple (Trinity)
Maurizio Giuliano (Fitzwilliam)
Joanna Kavenna (St John's)
Alexander William Kinglake (Trinity)
Robert Macfarlane (Pembroke/Emmanuel)
Fynes Moryson (Peterhouse)
Matthew Parris (Clare)
Gerald Sparrow
Terry Waite (Trinity Hall)
Ted Walker (St John's)
Samantha Weinberg (Trinity)

The arts

Actors, comedians, directors, producers and screenwriters

A–G

Khalid Abdalla (Queens')
Clive Anderson (Selwyn)
Michael Apted (Downing), Grammy Award winner
David Armand (St Catharine's)
Alexander Armstrong (Trinity), BAFTA joint winner
Lord Richard Attenborough (Emmanuel), Academy Award winner
Richard Ayoade (St Catharine's)
James Bachman (Emmanuel)
David Baddiel (King's)
Jamie Bamber (St John's)
Christopher Barry (unknown)
Tom Basden (Pembroke)
Robert Bathurst (Pembroke)
Sir Simon Russell Beale (Caius)
Rodney Bennett (St John's)
John Bird (King's)
Simon Bird (Queens'), BAFTA winner
James Bloor (unknown)
Hugh Bonneville (Corpus Christi)
Eleanor Bron (Newnham)
Tim Brooke-Taylor (Pembroke)
Tony Buffery (Corpus Christi)
Jimmy Carr (Caius)
Graham Chapman (Emmanuel)
John Cleese (Downing), Emmy Award winner
Sacha Baron Cohen (Christ's)
Horace de Vere Cole (Trinity)
Lily Cole (King's)
Peter Cook (Pembroke), Grammy Award winner
Christian Coulson (Clare College)
James Dacre (Jesus)
Trevor Dann (Fitzwilliam)
Hugh Dennis (St John's)
Diana Devlin (Newnham)
Declan Donnellan (Queens')
Robin Ellis (Fitzwilliam)
Mark Evans (unknown)
Sir Richard Eyre (Peterhouse)
Julian Fellowes (Magdalene), Academy Award winner
Jason Forbes (Jesus)
Trent Ford (Clare)
John Fortune (King's)
Stephen Frears (Trinity)
Robin French (Selwyn)
Stephen Fry (Queens')
Graeme Garden (Emmanuel)
Genevieve Gaunt (Newnham)
Mel Giedroyc (Trinity)
Stefan Golaszewski (unknown)
Paul Greengrass (Queens')

H–M

Sir Peter Hall (St Catharine's)
Rebecca Hall (St Catharine's)
Andy Hamilton (Downing)
Phil Hammond (Girton)
Nick Hancock (Homerton)
Terrence Hardiman (Fitzwilliam)
Gerald Harper (unknown)
Naomie Harris (Pembroke)
Tony Hendra  (St. John's)
Tom Hiddleston (Pembroke), Golden Globe Award winner
Freddie Highmore (Emmanuel)
Philip Hinchcliffe (Pembroke)
Tom Hollander (Selwyn)
Matthew Holness (Trinity Hall)
The Hollow Men (St Catharine's/Selwyn/Emmanuel)
John Hopkins (St Catharine's)
 Alex Horne (Sidney Sussex)
Waris Hussein (Queens')
 Peter Matthew Hutton (Selwyn)
Sir Nicholas Hytner (Trinity Hall)
Eric Idle (Pembroke)
Sir Derek Jacobi (St John's), Emmy Award winner
Sir Antony Jay (Magdalene)
Humphrey Jennings (Pembroke)
Griff Rhys Jones (Emmanuel)
Ellie Kendrick (Jesus)
Duncan Kenworthy (Christ's)
Paul King (St Catharine's)
Matt Kirshen (Clare)
Hugh Laurie (Selwyn), Golden Globe Award winner
John Lloyd (Trinity)
Alice Lowe (King's)
Jonathan Lynn (Pembroke)
Graeme MacDonald (Jesus)
John Madden (Sidney Sussex)
Stephen Mangan (Caius)
Miriam Margolyes (Newnham)
James Mason (Peterhouse)
Sir Ian McKellen (St Catharine's)
Sir Sam Mendes (Peterhouse), Academy Award winner
Roger Michell (Queens')
Lord Bernard Miles (Pembroke)
Miles Millar (Christ's)
Ben Miller (St Catharine's), BAFTA joint winner
Sir Jonathan Miller (St John's)
David Mitchell (Peterhouse), BAFTA joint winner
Nick Mohammed (Magdalene)
Lucy Montgomery (unknown)
Hattie Morahan (New Hall)
Neil Mullarkey (Robinson)
Richard Murdoch (Pembroke)
Hannah Murray (Queens')

N–Z

Henry Naylor (Downing)
Mike Newell (Magdalene)
Robert Newman (Selwyn)
Thandie Newton (Downing)
James Norton (Fitzwilliam)
Sir Trevor Nunn (Downing)
Bill Oddie (Pembroke)
John Oliver (Christ's), Emmy Award winner
Barunka O'Shaughnessy (unknown)
Richard Osman (Trinity)
Tony Palmer (Trinity Hall), Emmy Award winner
Andy Parsons (Christ's)
Alice Patten (Queens')
John Percival (Sidney Sussex)
Sue Perkins (New Hall)
Steve Punt (St Catharine's)
Frederic Raphael (St John's), Academy Award winner
Jan Ravens (Homerton), first female president of Footlights
Corin Redgrave (King's)
Sir Michael Redgrave (Magdalene)
Eddie Redmayne (Trinity), Academy Award winner
Karel Reisz (Emmanuel)
Blake Ritson (unknown)
Matthew Robinson (King's)
Antony Root (Christ's)
Nicola Shindler (Caius)
John Shrapnel (St Catharine's)
Don Siegel (Jesus), Academy Award winner
Tony Slattery (Trinity Hall)
Iain Softley (Queens')
Dan Stevens (Emmanuel)
Tim Sullivan (Fitzwilliam)
Jonny Sweet (Pembroke)
Clive Swift (Caius)
David Swift (Caius)
Tilda Swinton (New Hall), Academy Award winner
Fagun Thakrar (Pembroke)
Joe Thomas (Pembroke)
Emma Thompson (Newnham), Academy Award winner
Sandi Toksvig (Girton)
Richard Vranch (unknown)
Nicola Walker (New Hall)
Holly Walsh (Caius)
 Phil Wang (King's)
Rick Warden (Churchill)
Mark Watson (Queens')
Robert Webb (Robinson), BAFTA joint winner
Rachel Weisz (Trinity Hall), Academy Award winner
Chris Weitz (Trinity)
Olivia Williams (Newnham)
Michael Winner (Downing)
Lloyd Woolf (unknown)
Basil Wright (Corpus Christi)
Terence Young (St Catharine's)

Architects 

Christopher Alexander (Trinity)
Sir Arthur Blomfield (Trinity)
Peter Boston (King's)
W. D. Caroe (Trinity)
Sir Hugh Casson (St John's)
Basil Champneys (Trinity)
Edward Cullinan (unknown)
Peter Eisenman (Trinity)
Ralph Erskine (Clare Hall)
James Essex (King's)
Spencer de Grey (Churchill)
Lord Thomas de Grey (St John's)
Judith Ledeboer (Newnham)
Sir Leslie Martin (Jesus)
Rod I. McAllister (Girton)
Graham Morrison (Jesus)
Frank Newby (Trinity)
Christopher Nicholson (St John's)
Jadwiga Piłsudska (Newnham)
Cedric Price (St John's)
Edward Schroeder Prior (Caius)
Sir Charles Herbert Reilly (Queens')
Ian Ritchie (unknown)
Deborah Saunt (unknown)
Harold Tomlinson (unknown)
William Wilkins (Caius)
Sir Clough Williams-Ellis (Trinity)
Sir Colin St John Wilson (Corpus Christi/Churchill)
Sir Matthew Digby Wyatt (unknown)
Ken Yeang (Wolfson)

Artists

Lord Antony Armstrong-Jones (Jesus), portrait photographer and Emmy Award winner
Sir Cecil Beaton (St John's), fashion and portrait photographer, diarist, style icon, interior designer and Academy Award-winning stage and costume designer
Quentin Blake (Downing), cartoonist, illustrator and children's author, well known for his collaborations with writer Roald Dahl
Sir Roy Yorke Calne (unknown), contemporary painter and Group 90 member
Sir Anthony Caro (Christ's), abstract sculptor, famed for the use of 'found' industrial objects
Ralph Chubb (Selwyn), late Romantic painter and printer
Roger Fry (King's), modernist painter and Bloomsbury Group member
Antony Gormley (Trinity), sculptor, best known for the Angel of the North
Jon Harris (Trinity Hall), painter, illustrator, and calligrapher, best known for his drawings of Cambridge
Wuon-Gean Ho (unknown), contemporary artist and printmaker 
Benjamin Hope (unknown), painter, noted for plein air oil paintings of London
Luke Piper (unknown), contemporary landscape painter
Marc Quinn (Robinson), contemporary sculptor, member of Young British Artists, best known for sculptures Self, Alison Lapper Pregnant and Siren
Mick Rock (Caius), pop culture photographer, renowned for iconic images of major rock bands
Julian Trevelyan (Trinity), surrealist painter and modern printmaker

Art critics, museum directors, and historians of art

Clive Bell (Trinity), Formalist art critic, Bloomsbury Group member
Anita Brookner (Murray Edwards), art historian, Reader at the Courtauld Institute of Art and first female Slade Professor of Fine Art
 Sir Sydney Cockerell (unknown), Director of the Fitzwilliam Museum and close friend of John Ruskin
William George Constable (St John's), Curator of the Boston Museum of Fine Art and assistant director of the National Gallery
Shalini Ganendra (Trinity Hall), fine arts consultant and gallerist, judge on various art award panels
Michael Jaffé (King's), art historian, Director of the Fitzwilliam Museum and Proprietor of Clifton Maybank House
Michael Kitson (King's), art historian, Claude Lorrain expert, professor at the Slade School of Fine Art and the Courtauld Institute of Art
Joseph Koerner (unknown), art historian, German art expert, Professor of History of Art and Architecture at Harvard and lecturer at the Courtauld Institute of Art
Lothar Ledderose (unknown), Professor of the History of Art of Eastern Asia at the University of Heidelberg, Mellon Lecturer at the National Gallery of Art
Timothy Potts (Clare), Director of the Kimbell Art Museum, the National Gallery of Victoria and the Fitzwilliam Museum
Duncan Robinson (Clare/Magdalene), Director of the Fitzwilliam Museum and Chairman of the Henry Moore Foundation
Simon Schama (Christ's), art historian and critic, professor at Columbia University, award-winning author and documentary director
Sir Nicholas Serota (Christ's), Director of the Whitechapel Gallery and The Museum of Modern Art, Oxford, chairman of the Turner Prize jury
Sir Charles Waldstein (King's), Director of the American School of Classical Studies, the Archaeological Institute of America and the Fitzwilliam Museum
Lord Horatio Walpole (King's), art historian and Proprietor of Strawberry Hill
Sir Matthew Digby Wyatt (unknown), art historian, Secretary of the Great Exhibition and the first Slade Professor of Fine Art

Musicians

A–G

Thomas Adès (King's)
Julian Anderson (King's)
Malcolm Archer (Jesus)
Sir Richard Armstrong (Corpus Christi)
David Atherton (Fitzwilliam/Trinity)
Pete Atkin (St John's)
Martin Baker (Downing)
Stephen Barlow (Trinity)
George Benjamin (King's)
Sir William Sterndale Bennett (King's)
Sir Arthur Bliss (Pembroke)
Leslie Bricusse (Caius), Academy and Grammy Award winner
Herbert De Pinna
William Denis Browne (Clare)
Humphrey Burton (Fitzwilliam), Emmy Award winner
Clemency Burton-Hill (Magdalene)
John Butt (King's)
Andrew Carwood (St John's)
Stephen Cleobury (St John's)
Nicholas Cook (Darwin)
Arnold Cooke (Caius)
Benjamin Cooke (unknown)
Harold Darke (King's)
Thurston Dart (unknown)
Sir Andrew Davis (King's)
Sir Colin Davis (unknown), Grammy Award winner
John Deathridge (King's)
E. J. Dent (King's)
Delia Derbyshire (Girton)
Nick Drake (Fitzwilliam)
Richard Egarr (Clare)
Sir Mark Elder (Corpus Christi)
Robert Fayrfax (King's)
Simon H. Fell (Fitzwilliam)
Matthew Fisher (Wolfson)
Fred Frith (Christ's)
Andrew Gant (St John's)
Sir John Eliot Gardiner (King's), Grammy Award winner
Noel Gay (Christ's)
Orlando Gibbons (King's)
Armstrong Gibbs (Trinity)
James Gilchrist (King's)
Charlie Gillett (Peterhouse)
Sir William Glock (Caius)
Alexander Goehr (Trinity Hall)
Rachel Gough (King's)
Alan Gray (Trinity)
John Greaves (Pembroke)
Maurice Greene (unknown)
Colin Greenwood (Peterhouse), Grammy Award winner
Douglas Guest (King's)
George Guest (St John's)

H–M

Patrick Hadley (Pembroke)
Charles Hart (Robinson)
Jonathan Harvey (St John's)
Kit Hesketh-Harvey (Clare)
Richard Hickox (Queens'), Grammy Award winner
Tim Hodgkinson (unknown)
Christopher Hogwood (Pembroke)
Robin Holloway (King's/Caius)
Herbert Howells (St John's)
Eric Idle (Pembroke), Grammy Award winner
Brian Kay (King's), Grammy Award winner
Simon Keenlyside (St John's)
Jonathon King (Trinity)
Robert King (St John's)
Robert Kirby (Caius)
Markus Kuhn (Wolfson)
Stephen Layton (King's/Trinity)
Sir Philip Ledger (King's)
Walter Leigh (Christ's)
Raymond Leppard (Trinity)
Sir George Alexander Macfarren (unknown)
Joanna MacGregor (New Hall)
Andrew Manze (Clare)
Richard Marlow (Selwyn/Trinity)
Andrew Marriner (King's)
Rory McEwen (Trinity)
Hubert Stanley Middleton (Peterhouse/Trinity)
Silvina Milstein (Jesus/King's)
David Munrow (Pembroke), Grammy Award winner

N–Z

John Noble (Fitzwilliam)
Sir Roger Norrington (Clare), Grammy Award winner
Boris Ord (Corpus Christi/King's)
Tarik O'Regan (Corpus Christi/Trinity)
Robin Orr (Pembroke)
Martin Outram (Fitzwilliam)
Christopher Page (Sidney Sussex)
Christopher Palmer (Trinity)
Roger Parker (St John's)
David Parry (unknown)
Geoffrey Paterson (St John's)
Ernst Pauer (unknown)
John Potter (King's/Caius)
Andrew Powell (King's)
Clement Power (Caius)
Simon Preston (King's)
Robert Ramsey (Trinity)
William Henry Reed (unknown)
Kimberley Rew (Jesus)
Alan Ridout (unknown)
Cyril Rootham (St John's)
John Rutter (Clare)
Rina Sawayama (Magdalene)
Matthew Schellhorn (Girton)
John Scott (St John's)
Cecil Sharp (Clare)
Geoffrey Shaw (Caius)
David Skinner (Sidney Sussex)
Sir Arthur Somervell (King's)
Tim Souster (King's)
Roger Smalley (King's)
John Spiers (King's)
Nicholas Staggins (unknown)
Simon Standage (King's)
Sir Charles Villiers Stanford (Queens'/Trinity)
Bernard Stevens (unknown)
Richard Stilgoe (Clare)
Mark Stone (King's)
Jeffrey Tate (Christ's), conductor
Art Themen (unknown)
Christopher Tye
Roger Vignoles (Magdalene)
Thomas Attwood Walmisley (Trinity/St John's/Jesus)
Jeremy Warmsley (Churchill)
Judith Weir (King's)
Eric Whitacre (Sidney Sussex)
John Clarke Whitfield (Trinity/St John's)
Sir David Willcocks (King's), Grammy Award winner
Jonathan Willcocks (Trinity)
Ralph Vaughan Williams (Trinity)
Sir Steuart Wilson (King's)
Tony Wilson (Jesus)
Charles Wood (Selwyn/Caius)
Maury Yeston (Clare), Tony Award winner

Groups

Alamire (Sidney Sussex)
Cambridge Buskers (unknown)
Cambridge Singers (Clare)
Cantabile (various)
The Cardinall's Musick (various)
Clean Bandit (Jesus), Grammy Award winners
Endellion Quartet (various)
The Fitzwilliam Quartet (Fitzwilliam), Grammy Award winners
Henry Cow (various)
Hot Chip (Sidney Sussex/Jesus)
Katrina and the Waves (Jesus), Eurovision Song Contest winners
The King's Consort (St John's)
The King's Singers (King's), Grammy Award winners
Kit and The Widow (Clare)
Monteverdi Choir (King's)
Retrospect Ensemble (St John's)
The Soft Boys (various)
Spiers and Boden (King's)
Sports Team (unknown)
Stile Antico (Trinity), Grammy Award winners
Trinity Baroque (Trinity)

Academic disciplines

Scientists, technologists, and mathematicians

A–C

Rediet Abebe (Pembroke), mathematician and computer scientist 
Samson Abramsky (King's), computer scientist
John Couch Adams (St John's), mathematician and astronomer
Gilbert Smithson Adair (King's), protein scientist
Lord Adrian (Trinity), Nobel Prize winner, physiologist
Wilfred Eade Agar (King's), animal scientist
Sir George Airy (Trinity)
Pat Ambler (Newnham), roboticist
Philip Warren Anderson (Churchill/Jesus), Nobel Prize winner, physicist
Ross J. Anderson (Trinity), computer scientist
Sir Edward Appleton (St John's), Nobel Prize winner, physicist
Francis Aston (Trinity), Nobel Prize winner, physicist
Sir Michael Atiyah (Trinity), Fields Medal and Abel Prize winner
Charles Babbage (Peterhouse), mathematician
Alan Baker (Trinity), Fields Medal winner, mathematician
H. F. Baker (St. John's)
Charles Barkla (Trinity/King's), Nobel Prize winner, physicist
Horace Barlow (Trinity)
Simon Baron-Cohen (Trinity), psychologist
Isaac Barrow (Trinity)
John Barrow (Clare), Templeton Prize winner, mathematician
Tristan Bekinschtein, neuroscientist.
Noel Benson (unknown), geologist
John Desmond Bernal (Emmanuel)
Elizabeth Blackburn (Darwin), Nobel Prize winner
Patrick Blackett (Magdalene/King's), Nobel Prize winner, physicist
Sarah Bohndiek (Corpus Christi), physicist
Niels Bohr (Trinity), Nobel Prize winner, physicist
Béla Bollobás (Trinity)
Enrico Bombieri (Trinity), Fields Medal winner, mathematician
Sir Hermann Bondi (Trinity), Mathematician and cosmologist
Richard Borcherds (Trinity), Fields Medal winner, mathematician
Max Born (Caius), Nobel Prize winner
Sir Jagdish Chandra Bose (Christ's)
Sir Lawrence Bragg (Trinity), Nobel Prize winner
Sir William Henry Bragg (Trinity), Nobel Prize winner
Sydney Brenner (King's), Nobel Prize winner
Alec Broers (Caius)
Jacob Bronowski (Jesus)
Tony Buffery (Corpus Christi)
Michael Burrows (Churchill), inventor of the first internet search machine, Alta Vista
Sir Roy Yorke Calne (Trinity Hall)
Roger Carpenter (Caius)
James McKeen Cattell, psychologist
Henry Cavendish (Peterhouse)
Arthur Cayley (Trinity)
Sir James Chadwick (Caius), Nobel Prize winner
Ernst Chain (Fitzwilliam), Nobel Prize winner
Subrahmanyan Chandrasekhar (Trinity), Nobel Prize winner
John Coates (Emmanuel)
Sir John Cockcroft (St John's), Nobel Prize winner
Sir Christopher Cockerell (Peterhouse)
Joseph Comerford (Fitzwilliam)
Arthur Holly Compton (unknown), Nobel Prize winner
John Horton Conway (Caius)
David Cordier (unknown)
Allan Cormack (St John's), Nobel Prize winner
Sir Alan Cottrell (Christ's/Jesus), Chief Scientific Adviser
Francis Crick (Caius/Churchill), Nobel Prize winner
David Crighton (St. John's)

D–G

Henry Dale (Trinity), Nobel Prize winner
Charles Darwin (Christ's), naturalist
Sir Charles Galton Darwin (Trinity/Christ's)
Erasmus Darwin (St John's)
Sir Francis Sacheverel Darwin (Emmanuel)
Sir George Darwin (Trinity)
Harold Davenport (Trinity)
Ashika David (Trinity)
Aubrey de Grey (Trinity Hall)
John Dee (St John's/Trinity)
Beryl Dent (Newnham), English mathematical physicist
Duncan R. Derry (unknown), Logan Medal winner, economic geologist
Sir James Dewar (Peterhouse)
Jared Diamond (Trinity), Pulitzer Prize winner
Paul Dirac (St John's), Nobel Prize winner
Simon Donaldson (Pembroke), Fields Medal winner
Freeman Dyson (Trinity), Templeton Prize winner
Sir Arthur Eddington (Trinity)
Robert Edwards (Churchill), Nobel Prize winner
Sam Edwards (Caius)
Sir Martin Evans (Christ's), biochemist, Nobel Prize winner
Thomas Campbell Eyton (St John's), naturalist
Alan Fersht (Caius)
Ronald Fisher (Caius)
John Flamsteed (Jesus)
Howard Florey (Caius), Nobel Prize winner
Dian Fossey (Darwin)
Sir Michael Foster (Trinity)
Sir Ralph Fowler (Trinity)
William Fowler (Pembroke), Nobel Prize winner
Rosalind Franklin (Newnham)
Sir Richard Friend (Trinity/St John's)
Sir Francis Galton (Trinity)
Mike Gascoyne (Churchill), chief technical officer of the Caterham F1 Formula One team
Gary Gibbons (Trinity)
Walter Gilbert (Trinity), Nobel Prize winner
William Gilbert (St John's)
Sir Harold Gillies (Caius)
Peter Goddard (St. John's)
Thomas Gold (Trinity)
Jane Goodall (Newnham/Darwin)
Timothy Gowers (Trinity), Fields Medal winner
George Green (Caius)
Michael Green (Churchill/Clare Hall)
Paul Greengard (unknown), Nobel Prize winner
Siân Griffiths (New Hall)
Richard Kenneth Guy (Caius), British mathematician

H–M

J. B. S. Haldane (Trinity)
Nicholas Harberd (Christ's), Fellow of the Royal Society
Gaylord Harnwell (unknown)
G. H. Hardy (Trinity), discovered Srinivasa Ramanujan
Douglas Hartree (St. John's)
H. W. Harvey (Downing), marine biologist
William Harvey (Caius)
Stephen Hawking (Trinity Hall/Caius)
Roger Heath-Brown (Trinity)
William Heberden (St John's)
Richard Henderson (Corpus Christi/Darwin), Nobel Prize winner
Richard Henson, neuroscientist
Sir John Herschel (St John's)
Antony Hewish (Caius/Churchill), Nobel Prize winner
A. V. Hill (Trinity), Nobel Prize winner
Dorothy Hill (Newnham)
Christopher Hinton (Trinity), Turing Award winner
WVD Hodge (Pembroke)
Alan Hodgkin (Trinity), Nobel Prize winner
Dorothy Hodgkin (Newnham/Girton), Nobel Prize winner
Sir Frederick Hopkins (Trinity/Emmanuel), Nobel Prize winner
Sir Fred Hoyle (Emmanuel)
Ieuan Hughes, Emeritus Professor of Paediatrics
Sir Tim Hunt (Clare), Nobel Prize winner
Sir Andrew Huxley (Trinity), Nobel Prize winner
Edward A. Irving (unknown), Logan Medal winner
James Jeans (Trinity)
Karen Spärck Jones (Girton)
Brian Josephson (Trinity), Nobel Prize winner
Pyotr Kapitsa (Trinity), Nobel Prize winner
Kay-Tee Khaw (Girton/Caius), Professor of Clinical Gerontology 
Stan Kelly-Bootle (Downing)
Sir John Kendrew (Trinity), Nobel Prize winner
Sir Geoffrey Keynes (Pembroke)
Phil Kwok (Pembroke),  Guest Lecturer at Cambridge University and Co-Founder of EasyA
Sir David King (Downing), Chief Scientific Adviser
Sir Aaron Klug (Trinity/Peterhouse), Nobel Prize winner
Georges J.F. Kohler (unknown), Nobel Prize winner
Sir Hans Krebs (Girton), Nobel Prize winner
Horace Lamb (Trinity)
Joseph Larmor (St. John's)
David Lary (Churchill)
Imre Leader (Trinity)
Louis Leakey (St John's)
Georges Lemaître (St Edmund's)
John Lennard-Jones (Trinity)
Geraint F. Lewis (unknown), astrophysicist
Jack Lewis, Baron Lewis of Newnham (Robinson)
James Lighthill (Trinity)
John Edensor Littlewood (Trinity)
Peter Littlewood (Trinity)
Alan MacDiarmid (Sidney Sussex), Nobel Prize winner
Sir David MacKay (Trinity/Darwin), Chief Scientific Adviser to DECC
Thomas Henry Manning (unknown)
Elizabeth Nesta Marks (Newnham)
Archer Martin (Peterhouse), Nobel Prize winner
Keith Martin
Peter Mathieson (Christ's), Vice-Chancellor of University of Hong Kong
Duncan Maskell (Caius/Wolfson), biochemist and Senior Pro-Vice Chancellor of the University of Cambridge
James Clerk Maxwell (Trinity)
Robert May, Baron May of Oxford (unknown), Chief Scientific Adviser
Robin Milner (King's), Turing Award winner
César Milstein (Fitzwilliam/Darwin), Nobel Prize winner
Peter Mitchell (Jesus), Nobel Prize winner
John Keith Moffat (King's), Guggenheim Fellow, biologist
Keith Moffatt (Trinity)
Augustus De Morgan (Trinity)
Simon Conway Morris (St John's)
Nevill Mott (Caius/St John's), Nobel Prize winner

N–R

Roger Needham (St John's/Wolfson)
Michael Neuberger (Trinity)
Sir Isaac Newton (Trinity)
Sir Robin Nicholson (St Catharine's/Christ's), Chief Scientific Adviser
Ronald Norrish (Emmanuel), Nobel Prize winner
Lawrence Ogilvie (Emmanuel), plant pathologist, entomologist, mycologist
J. Robert Oppenheimer (Christ's), scientific director of the Manhattan Project
Jeremiah Ostriker (unknown)
William Oughtred (King's), inventor of the slide rule and the "×" symbol for multiplication
Sir Charles Algernon Parsons (St John's)
George Peacock (Trinity)
Karl Pearson (King's)
Sir Roger Penrose (St John's)
Max Perutz (Peterhouse), Nobel Prize winner
Joseph Pesce (Peterhouse)
Sir Brian Pippard (Clare Hall)
John Polkinghorne (Trinity/Queens'), Templeton Prize winner
Sir John Pople (Trinity), Nobel Prize winner
George Porter (Emmanuel), Nobel Prize winner
Rodney Porter (Pembroke), Nobel Prize winner
Cecil Powell (Sidney Sussex), Nobel Prize winner
Reginald Punnett (Caius)
Alfred Radcliffe-Brown (Trinity)
Srinivasa Ramanujan (Trinity)
Frank P. Ramsey (Magdalene/Trinity/King's), Ramsey theory, Decision theory
Norman F. Ramsey (Clare), Nobel Prize winner
Sir John Randall (unknown)
John Ray (St Catharine's)
Lord Rayleigh (Trinity), Nobel Prize winner
Lord Martin Rees (Trinity), Astronomer Royal
Osborne Reynolds (Queens')
Owen Richardson (Trinity), Nobel Prize winner
W. H. R. Rivers (St John's)
Steven Rose (King's)
Klaus Roth (Peterhouse), Fields Medal winner
Edward Routh (Peterhouse)
Ernest Rutherford (Trinity), Nobel Prize winner
Christopher Rudd (unknown), immunologist
Martin Ryle (Trinity), Nobel Prize winner

S–Z

Barbara Sahakian (Clare Hall), professor of Clinical Neuropsychology
Umar Saif (Trinity), computer science 
Abdus Salam (St John's), Nobel Prize winner
Frederick Sanger (St John's), winner of two Nobel Prizes
Vikram Sarabhai (St John's)
Nicholas Saunderson (Christ's)
Richard R. Schrock (unknown), Nobel Prize winner
Dennis William Sciama (Trinity), physicist
Sir Nicholas Shackleton (Clare)
Rupert Sheldrake (Clare)
Sir Charles Scott Sherrington (Fitzwilliam/Caius), Nobel Prize winner
Simon Singh (Emmanuel)
Herchel Smith (Emmanuel)
John Maynard Smith (Trinity)
C. P. Snow (Christ's)
Ian Stewart (Churchill), mathematician 
George Gabriel Stokes (Pembroke)
Bjarne Stroustrup (Churchill), inventor of C++
Audrey Stuckes (Newnham), material scientist
John Sulston (Pembroke), Nobel Prize winner
M. S. Swaminathan (Fitzwilliam), World Food Prize winner
James Joseph Sylvester (St John's)
Richard Synge (Trinity), Nobel Prize winner
Albert Szent-Györgyi (Fitzwilliam), Nobel Prize winner
Peter Guthrie Tait (Peterhouse)
Simon Tatham (Trinity)
Brook Taylor (St John's)
Sir Geoffrey Ingram Taylor (Trinity)
Chris D. Thomas (Corpus), FRS
John Griggs Thompson (Churchill), Fields Medal winner
Sir George Paget Thomson (Trinity), Nobel Prize winner
J. J. Thomson (Trinity), Nobel Prize winner
William Thomson, 1st Baron Kelvin (Peterhouse)
Alexander Todd (Christ's), Nobel Prize winner
Chai Keong Toh (King's)
Roger Y. Tsien (Churchill), Nobel Prize winner
Alan Turing (King's)
Neil Turok (Churchill), mathematician
William Tutte (Trinity)
Stephen Tweedie (Churchill), software developer
Srinivasan Varadarajan, chemist and Padma Bhushan awardee
John Venn (Caius)
Jemma Wadham, glacial biogeochemist, Antarctic researcher
Sir John E. Walker (Sidney Sussex), Nobel Prize winner
John Wallis (Emmanuel)
Ernest Walton (Trinity), Nobel Prize winner
James D. Watson (Clare), Nobel Prize winner
Steven Weinberg (unknown), Nobel Prize winner
David Wheeler (Trinity/Darwin)
A.N. Whitehead (Trinity)
E.T. Whittaker (Trinity)
Sir Frank Whittle (Peterhouse)
Sir Andrew Wiles (Clare)
Sir Maurice Wilkes (St John's), Turing Award winner
Maurice Wilkins (St John's), Nobel Prize winner
Sir Ian Wilmut (Darwin)
C. T. R. Wilson (Sidney Sussex), Nobel Prize winner
Edward Adrian Wilson (Caius)
J. Tuzo Wilson (St. John's)
 Sophie Wilson, computer scientist and software engineer, designed the Acorn Micro-Computer
Sir Greg Winter (Trinity), Nobel Prize winner
Ian H. Witten (Caius), mathematics, Hector Memorial Medal, IFIP Namur Award for Greenstone
William Hyde Wollaston (Caius), Copley Medal winner
Thomas Young (Emmanuel)
Christopher Zeeman (Christ's), mathematician
Jenny Zhang (Corpus Christi), chemist

Astronauts

Michael Foale (Queens'), NASA astronaut
Nicholas Patrick (Trinity), NASA astronaut
David Saint-Jacques (Corpus Christi), Canadian Space Agency astronaut
Jennifer Sidey (Jesus), Canadian Space Agency astronaut

Philosophers

A–M

G. E. M. Anscombe (Newnham)
Kwame Anthony Appiah (Clare)
Sri Aurobindo (King's)
Sir Francis Bacon (Trinity)
Cristina Bicchieri (Wolfson)
Simon Blackburn (Trinity/Churchill)
Alain de Botton (Caius)
R. B. Braithwaite (King's)
C. D. Broad (Trinity)
Myles Burnyeat (King's/Robinson)
Jeremy Butterfield (Trinity)
Gary Chartier (Queens')
Samuel Clarke (Caius)
Stephen R. L. Clark (Queens')
William Kingdon Clifford (Trinity)
Tim Crane (Trinity)
Aleister Crowley (Trinity)
Ralph Cudworth (Emmanuel/Christ's/Clare)
Richard Cumberland (Magdalene)
Don Cupitt (Emmanuel)
Desiderius Erasmus (Queens')
Paul Feyerabend (unknown)
Peter Geach (unknown)
Raymond Geuss (none)
Mary Louise Gill
Lydia Goehr
Susan Haack (New Hall)
Ian Hacking (Trinity)
Charles Hampden-Turner (Trinity)
David Hartley (Jesus)
Mary Hesse (unknown)
Thomas Hobbes (St John's)
Sir Muhammad Iqbal (Trinity)
Nicholas Jardine (Darwin)
Emily Elizabeth Constance Jones (Girton)
Philip Kitcher (Christ's)
Georg Kreisel (Trinity)
Martin Kusch (unknown)
Imre Lakatos (King's)
Casimir Lewy (Trinity)
E. J. Lowe (Fitzwilliam)
John Lucas (Corpus Christi)
Donald M. MacKinnon (unknown)
Ruth Barcan Marcus (Clare Hall)
Moez Masoud (Fitzwilliam)
Margaret Masterman (Lucy Cavendish)
Emil Mattiesen
Marshall McLuhan (Trinity Hall)
J. M. E. McTaggart (Trinity)
Hugh Mellor (Pembroke/Darwin)
G. E. Moore (Trinity)
Henry More (Christ's)
Peter Munz (unknown)
Iris Murdoch (Newnham)

N–Z

Michael Oakeshott (Caius)
C. K. Ogden (Magdalene)
Onora O'Neill (Newnham)
G. E. L. Owen (unknown)
William Paley (Christ's)
Sir Karl Popper (Darwin)
Graham Priest (St John's)
Frank P. Ramsey (Magdalene/Trinity/King's)
Bertrand Russell (Trinity), Nobel Prize winner
George Santayana (King's)
Duns Scotus (unknown)
Roger Scruton (Jesus/Peterhouse)
Henry Sidgwick (Trinity)
B. F. Skinner (Churchill)
Timothy Smiley (Clare)
John Smith (Emmanuel/Queens')
Timothy Sprigge (Caius)
George Steiner (Churchill)
C. L. Stevenson (unknown)
Leo Strauss (Caius)
Galen Strawson (unknown)
Stephen Toulmin (King's)
John Venn (Caius)
Michael Walzer (unknown)
James Ward (Fitzwilliam/Trinity)
William Whewell (Trinity)
Benjamin Whichcote (Emmanuel/King's)
Alfred North Whitehead (Trinity)
Sir Bernard Williams (King's)
John Wisdom (Trinity)
Ludwig Wittgenstein (Trinity)
John Worthington (Emmanuel/Jesus)
Crispin Wright (Trinity)

Economists

R. G. D. Allen (Sidney Sussex)
Andrew Bailey (Queens'), Governor of the Bank of England (2020–present)
Rowland Baring, 3rd Earl of Cromer (Trinity), Governor of the Bank of England (1961–1966)
Peter Thomas Bauer (Caius)
Charlie Bean (Emmanuel)
David Bensusan-Butt (King's)
Christopher Bliss (King's)
D. G. Champernowne (King's/Trinity)
Ha-Joon Chang (unknown)
Robert Chote (Queens')
Cameron Cobbold, 1st Baron Cobbold (King's), Governor of the Bank of England (1949–1961)
Alfred Clayton Cole (Trinity), Governor of the Bank of England (1911–1913)
John James Cowperthwaite (Christ's)
Walter Cunliffe, 1st Baron Cunliffe (Trinity), Governor of the Bank of England (1913–1918)
Angus Deaton (Fitzwilliam), Nobel Prize winner
Stanley Dennison (Trinity/Caius)
Gérard Debreu (Churchill), Nobel Prize winner
Maurice Dobb (Pembroke/Trinity)
John Eatwell, Baron Eatwell (Queens')
Robert Fogel (Trinity), Nobel Prize winner*
Milton Friedman (Caius), Nobel Prize winner*
John Kenneth Galbraith (Trinity)
Pierangelo Garegnani (Trinity)
Sir Edward George (Emmanuel), Governor of the Bank of England (1993–2003)
Sir Gilbert Heathcote, 1st Baronet (Christ's)
Oliver Hart (King's/Churchill), Nobel Prize winner
Noreena Hertz (King's)
Sir Hubert Henderson (Emmanuel/Clare)
John Hicks (Caius), Nobel Prize winner
John C. Hull (unknown)
Harry Johnson (Jesus)
Richard Kahn (King's)
Nicholas Kaldor (King's)
John Maynard Keynes (King's)
Mervyn King (King's/St John's), Governor of the Bank of England (2003–2013)
Patrick Lynch (Peterhouse)
Thomas Malthus (Jesus)
Alfred Marshall (St John's)
James Meade (Christ's/Trinity), Nobel Prize winner
Murray Milgate (Trinity/Queens')
James Mirrlees (Trinity), Nobel Prize winner
Robert Neild (Trinity)
Montagu Norman, 1st Baron Norman (King's), Governor of the Bank of England (1920–1944)
Douglass North (Girton), Nobel Prize winner*
Luigi Pasinetti (King's)
Arthur Cecil Pigou (King's)
Rogelio Ramírez de la O (Fitzwilliam)
Frank P. Ramsey (Magdalene/Trinity/King's)
Gordon Richardson (Caius), Governor of the Bank of England (1973–1983)
Dennis Robertson (Trinity)
Austin Robinson (Sidney Sussex)
Joan Robinson (Girton/Newnham/King's)
Amartya Sen (Trinity), Nobel Prize winner
Ajit Singh (Queens')
Piero Sraffa (Trinity)
Joseph Stiglitz (Caius/Fitzwilliam), Nobel Prize winner
Richard Stone (Caius/King's), Nobel Prize winner
John Vaizey (Queens')
Yuen Pau Woo (unknown)

 *  Not part of official Cambridge Nobel count.

Historians

A–M

David Abulafia (King's)
Lord Acton (Trinity)
Frank Adcock (King's)
Liaquat Ahamed (Trinity), Pulitzer Prize winner
David Armitage (St Catharine's)
Tony Badger (Sidney Sussex/Clare)
Jonathan Bate (St. Catharine's/Trinity Hall)
George Ewart Bean (Pembroke)
Paul Bew (Pembroke)
David Brading (Pembroke)
Asa Briggs (Sidney Sussex)
Lawrence Brockett (Trinity)
Sir Denis William Brogan (Peterhouse)
Hugh Brogan (St John's)
Oscar Browning (King's)
J. B. Bury (Trinity)
Sir Herbert Butterfield (Peterhouse)
Angus Calder (King's)
Sir David Cannadine (Clare/Christ's)
E. H. Carr (Trinity)
Hector Munro Chadwick (Clare)
John Chadwick (Corpus Christi)
Sir John Clapham (King's)
Alfred Cobban (Caius)
Simon Coleman (unknown)
Linda Colley (Girton/Newnham/Christ's)
Patrick Collinson (Pembroke)
John S. Conway (St John's)
G. G. Coulton (St Catharine's)
Maurice Cowling (Jesus/Peterhouse)
Jodocus Crull (King's)
William Dalrymple (Trinity)
Isaac Deutscher (unknown)
Rhoda Dorsey (unknown)
John Elliott (Trinity)
Sir Geoffrey Elton (Clare)
Richard J. Evans (Caius)
Robert Evans (Jesus)
Niall Ferguson (Christ's/Peterhouse)
Orlando Figes (Caius/Trinity)
Sir James Frazer (Trinity)
David J. Garrow (Homerton), Pulitzer Prize winner
Paul Ginsborg (Queens'/Churchill)
Thomas Gray (Peterhouse/Pembroke)
E. H. H. Green (St John's)
Bernard Green
John Guy (Clare)
Sir (Hrothgar) John Habakkuk (St John's)
Alfred Cort Haddon (Christ's), father of modern anthropology
Basil Liddell Hart (Corpus Christi)
Tobias Hecht (Clare Hall), American anthropologist
Marko Attila Hoare (Robinson)
Eric Hobsbawm (King's)
Richard Holmes (Emmanuel)
Harold James (Caius/Peterhouse)
Lisa Jardine (Newnham/Jesus/King's)
Nicholas Jardine (King's/Darwin)
Tony Judt (King's)
Colin Kidd (Caius)
Victor Kiernan (Trinity)
Alexander William Kinglake (Trinity)
James Klugmann (Trinity)
Wilbur Knorr (unknown)
David Knowles (Christ's/Peterhouse)
Peter Laslett (St John's)
John Le Neve (Trinity)
John Leland (Christ's), father of English history
Carenza Lewis (Corpus Christi)
Thomas Babington Macaulay (Trinity)
Diarmaid MacCulloch (Churchill)
Sir Henry James Sumner Maine (Pembroke/Trinity Hall)
F. W. Maitland (Trinity)
Peter Mathias (Jesus/Queens'/Downing)
Keith Middlemas (Pembroke)

N–Z

Joseph Needham (Caius)
Roy Franklin Nichols (unknown), Pulitzer Prize winner
C. Northcote Parkinson (Emmanuel)
Henry Pelling (St John's)
Harold Perkin (Jesus)
Sir John H. Plumb (Christ's/King's)
Sir Michael Postan (Peterhouse)
Justin Pollard (Downing)
Sir Frederick Pollock, 3rd Baronet (Trinity)
Roy Porter (Christ's/Churchill)
Sir Michael Postan (Peterhouse)
Eileen Power (Girton)
Sir George Prothero (King's)
Andrew Roberts (Caius)
George Rudé (Trinity)
Sir Steven Runciman (Trinity)
Dominic Sandbrook (Jesus)
Simon Schama (Christ's)
Arthur M. Schlesinger Jr. (Peterhouse), Pulitzer Prize winner
Simon Sebag-Montefiore (Caius)
Sir John Robert Seeley (Christ's/Caius)
Karl Schweizer  (Peterhouse)
Quentin Skinner (Caius/Christ's)
Denis Mack Smith (Peterhouse)
Sir Henry Spelman (Trinity)
Tom Stannage (unknown)
David Starkey (Fitzwilliam)
Norman Stone (Caius/Jesus/Trinity)
Harold McCarter Taylor (Clare)
Harold Temperley (King's/Peterhouse)
Dorothy Thompson (Girton)
E. P. Thompson (Corpus Christi)
David Thomson (Sidney Sussex)
G. M. Trevelyan (Trinity)
Hugh Trevor-Roper (Peterhouse)
Shallet Turner (Peterhouse)
George Waddington (Trinity)
Sir Adolphus William Ward (Peterhouse)
Charles Wilson (Jesus)
Robert M. Young (King's)

Linguists

Keith Brown (Pembroke), Editor-in-Chief of the Encyclopedia of Language and Linguistics
Leslie Peter Johnson (Pembroke), Germanist
John Lyons (Christ's), semanticist
April McMahon (Selwyn), evolutionary linguist
Peter Hugoe Matthews (St John's), morphologist
Rebecca Posner (Girton), Romance philologist
Ian Roberts (Downing), syntactician
Ghil'ad Zuckermann (Churchill), revivalist, contact linguist, lexicologist

Classicists

P. E. Easterling (Newnham)
Dame Mary Beard (Newnham)
Gábor Betegh (Christ's)
 Angus M. Bowie (Emmanuel)
James Clackson (Jesus)
James Duff Duff (Trinity)
Simon Goldhill (King's)
J. G. W. Henderson (King's)
Emily Gowers (St John's/Trinity)
Myles Burnyeat (Robinson)
Victoria Rimell (King's)
Paul Cartledge (Clare)
Robin Cormack (Wolfson)
Andrew Wallace-Hadrill (Sidney Sussex)
David Sedley (Christ's)
Richard L. Hunter (Trinity)
G. E. R. Lloyd (King's/Darwin)
Christopher Kelly (Corpus Christi)
Martin Millett (Fitzwilliam)
Stephen Oakley (Emmanuel)
Denys Page (Trinity/Jesus)
Peter Garnsey (Jesus)
Philip Hardie (Trinity)
Helen Lovatt (Pembroke)
Anthony Snodgrass (Clare)
Robin Osborne (King's)
Richard Duncan-Jones (Caius)
Caroline Vout (Newnham/Christ's)
A. E. Housman (St John's)
Michael Scott (Christ's/Darwin)
Tim Whitmarsh (St John's)
D. R. Shackleton Bailey (Caius)
Michael Reeve (Pembroke)
Roy Gibson (Sidney Sussex)

Armed forces

Charles Cornwallis (Clare), Lieutenant General
Oliver Cromwell (Sidney Sussex), Lord Protector
Sir Richard Dearlove (Queens'/Pembroke), Head of Secret Intelligence Service
Thomas Fairfax, 3rd Lord Fairfax of Cameron (St John's), Parliamentary commander-in-chief during the English Civil War
Billy Fiske (Trinity Hall), Second World War RAF pilot
Frank Ludlow (Sidney Sussex), botanist and Army officer
Louis Mountbatten (Christ's), First Sea Lord
Siegfried Sassoon (Clare), poet; Lieutenant, Sussex Yeomanry; awarded the Military Cross for actions during World War I
Arthur Tedder (Magdalene), First World War RAF pilot
Sir Peter Anthony Wall (Selwyn), Chief of General Staff, and Chief Royal Engineer

Educationalists

A–M

Theodore Acland (King's), Headmaster of Norwich School
Syed Ali Akbar (Peterhouse), major educator of Hyderabad State
Frederick Attenborough (Emmanuel), Principal of the University of Leicester and the West London Institute of Higher Education
John Haden Badley (Trinity), founder and first headmaster of Bedales School
Isaac Barrow (Peterhouse), founder of King William's College
St. Vincent Beechey (Caius), founder and first headmaster of Rossall School
Frank Bell (Peterhouse), founder and first Chairman of the Bell Educational Trust
Niels Bohr (Trinity), founder of the Institute of Theoretical Physics in Copenhagen
Lee Bollinger (Clare Hall), President of Columbia University and the University of Michigan
William Grant Broughton (unknown), founder of The King's School, Parramatta, Australia's first independent school
Sir Dominic Cadbury (Trinity), Chancellor of the University of Birmingham
Henry Cavendish (Peterhouse), co-founder of the Royal Institution
Lord William Cavendish (Trinity), founder of Eastbourne College and Chancellor of London University and Cambridge University
Sir William Cecil (St John's), responsible for revitalising Stamford School in 1548
Hugh Childers (Trinity), founder of the University of Melbourne
Sir Samuel Curran (St John's), founder, first Principal and first Vice-chancellor of the University of Strathclyde
Emily Davies (Girton), founder of Girton College, the first residential higher education institution for women
C. D. Deshmukh (Jesus), Vice-chancellor of the University of Delhi
Arthur Dunn (King's), founder and second master of Ludgrove School
Henry Dunster (Magdalene), first president of Harvard
Nathaniel Eaton (Trinity), first schoolmaster at Harvard
John Eliot (Jesus), founder of Roxbury Latin School, the oldest school in North America
Sir Christopher Frayling (Churchill), writer and educationalist
Anthony Giddens (King's), Director of the London School of Economics
Eli Gottlieb (St John's), Director of the Mandel Leadership Institute
Sir Brandon Gough (Jesus), Chancellor of the University of East Anglia and Chairman of the Higher Education Funding Council for England
Sir Hari Singh Gour (Downing), founder and Vice-chancellor of the University of Delhi, the University of Nagpur and the University of Sagar
Malcolm Grant (Clare), Provost and President of University College London
Sir Thomas Gresham (Caius), founder and first benefactor of Gresham College
Lord Thomas de Grey (St John's), co-founder of the Royal Institute of British Architects
Sir Peter Hall (St Catharine's), founder of the Royal Shakespeare Company and Director of the National Theatre
Andrew D. Hamilton (unknown), current Vice-chancellor of the University of Oxford
John Harvard (Emmanuel), co-founder and first benefactor of Harvard
Elizabeth Phillips Hughes (Newnham), de facto founder of Hughes Hall, Cambridge and campaigner for women's right to education
David Lloyd Johnston (unknown), former President of the University of Waterloo
Marty Kaplan (unknown), professor at the USC Annenberg School for Communication and founding director of the Norman Lear Center
Sir John Kingman (Pembroke), Vice-Chancellor of the University of Bristol and Director of the Isaac Newton Institute
Thomas Langley (Corpus Christi), founder of Durham School
Lord George Lascelles (King's), first Chancellor of the University of York
Edward Latymer (St John's), founder of The Latymer School and Latymer Upper School
Arthur Li (unknown), Vice-Chancellor of the Chinese University of Hong Kong
Thomas Linacre (St John's), founder of the Royal College of Physicians
Anthony R. M. Little (Corpus Christi), Headmaster of Eton College
Adam Loftus (Trinity), co-founder and first Provost of Trinity College, Dublin
Roger Lupton (King's), Provost of Eton College and founder of Sedbergh School
Jack Meyer (unknown), founder of Millfield School and St Lawrence College, Athens
Sir Walter Mildmay (Christ's), founder of Emmanuel College, Cambridge

N–Z

Bernard Orchard (Fitzwilliam), re-founder of St Benedict's School, lead it to become the only Catholic day school of Public School status
Karl Pearson (King's), founder of the world's first university statistics department at University College London
Stephen Perse (Caius), founder of The Perse School
John Pye-Smith (Homerton), co-founder of Mill Hill School
Alison Richard (Newnham), Provost of Yale University and Vice-chancellor of Cambridge University
Sir Evelyn Robert de Rothschild (Trinity), Governor of the London School of Economics and council member at RADA
Sir Nicholas Shackleton (Clare), Cambridge Professor and President of the International Union for Quaternary Research (INQUA)
Sheung-Wai Tam (Robinson), President of The Open University of Hong Kong and Chairman of St. Paul's Co-educational College
Shahid Aziz Siddiqi (Wolfson), Vice-chancellor of the Ziauddin Medical University
Henry Sidgwick (Trinity), co-founder of the Society for Psychical Research and Newnham College, Cambridge
John Sperling (King's), founder of the University of Phoenix
Sir Thomas Sutton (unknown), founder of Charterhouse School
Geoffrey Thomas (Churchill), President of Kellogg College, Oxford
Edward Thring (King's), Headmaster of Uppingham School and founder of the Headmasters' Conference
Sir John Tusa (Trinity/Wolfson), Chairman of the University of the Arts London (2007–)
William Waynflete (King's Hall), founder of Magdalen College, Oxford and Magdalen College School
William Wentworth (Peterhouse), de facto founder of the University of Sydney
John Whitgift (Queens'/Pembroke/Trinity), founder of Whitgift School and Trinity School and, indirectly, Old Palace School
Sir David Glyndwr Tudor Williams (Emmanuel/Wolfson), Chancellor of Swansea University and Vice-chancellor of Cambridge University
James Wilson (St John's), Headmaster of Clifton College
Michael Young (Churchill), co-founder of The Open University
Tristram Stuart (Trinity), author and sustainability campaigner

Entrepreneurs, business leaders and philanthropists

A–M

Marcus Agius (Trinity Hall), financier and businessman, chairman of Barclays bank
Lord Robert Alexander (King's), Chairman of the NatWest bank
Simon Ambrose (Magdalene), business entrepreneur, winner of The Apprentice
Simon Arora (unknown), billionaire CEO of B & M
Sir Hugh Barton (Trinity), chairman and managing director of Jardine, Matheson & Co
Peter Bazalgette (Fitzwilliam), media expert, Creative Director figure at the global TV firm Endemol
Sir Max Bemrose (Clare), noted industrialist
Karan Bilimoria (Sidney Sussex), entrepreneur, co-founder and Chairman of Cobra Beer
Lee Bollinger (Clare Hall), Chair of the Federal Reserve Bank of New York board of directors
John Browne (St John's), Chief Executive of BP
Stewart Butterfield (Clare College), co-founder of Slack Technologies and Flickr
Sir Egbert Cadbury (Trinity), managing director of Cadbury, the British confectionery firm
Dame Elizabeth Cadbury (unknown), philanthropist, founder of the Royal Orthopaedic Hospital
Peter Cadbury (Trinity), entrepreneur, founder and first chairman of Westward Television
Clementine Chambon chemical engineer, founder of Oorja Solutions
David Cleevely (unknown), entrepreneur and international telecoms expert, co-founder and Chief Executive of Abcam plc
Mark Coombs (St. John's), billionaire CEO of Ashmore Group
Gerald Corbett (Pembroke), Chief Executive of Railtrack, chairman Moneysupermarket.com and formerly Woolworths
Charles "Nick" Corfield (St John's), Silicon Valley entrepreneur, inventor of Adobe FrameMaker
Sir Andrew Crockett (Queens'), General Manager of the Bank for International Settlements, member of JPMorgan Chase and Group of Thirty
Andrew Currie (businessman) (unknown), billionaire director at Ineos
Gavyn Davies (St John's), managing director of Goldman Sachs investment bank and Chairman of the BBC
Sir C. D. Deshmukh (Jesus), Governor of the Reserve Bank of India (1943–1949)
Dinesh Dhamija (Fitzwilliam), founder, chairman and Chief Executive of the pioneering online travel agency Ebookers
Ray Dolby (Pembroke), audio technologies inventor and founder of Dolby
Mohamed A. El-Erian (Queens'), Chief Executive of PIMCO investment firm
Massimo Ellul (Judge Business School), marketing and management consultant; philanthropist
Sir Brandon Gough (Jesus), business leader, Chairman of Yorkshire Water, Coopers & Lybrand, and De La Rue plc
Roger J. Hamilton (Trinity), social entrepreneur, futurist, creator of Wealth Dynamics, Talent Dynamics, founder of Entrepreneurs Institute
Demis Hassabis (Queens'), entrepreneur, founder of Deepmind
David Harding (financier) (St. Catherine's), billionaire founder and CEO of Winton Group
Barney Harford (Clare), former CEO of Orbitz.com and COO of Uber
Clive Fiske Harrison (Trinity Hall), investment banker, Chairman of Fiske plc.
Hermann Hauser (King's), electronics entrepreneur, co-founder of Acorn Computers
Johnny Hon (Hughes Hall), Hong Kong born international businessman and founder of the Global Group
Andy Hopper (Corpus Christi), electronics entrepreneur, academic
Michael Johns (Caius), healthcare executive, former White House speechwriter
Sir Paul Judge (Trinity), businessman and entrepreneur, Director of Standard Bank Group
Nihad Kabir (unknown), President of Metropolitan Chamber of Commerce and Industry, Dhaka
Jonathan Kestenbaum, Baron Kestenbaum (born 1959), chief operating officer of investment trust RIT Capital Partners, and a Labour member of the House of Lords
Sir Henry Keswick (Trinity), Chairman of Jardine Matheson Holdings
Hosein Khajeh-Hosseiny (Trinity Hall), founder of OpenX Innovations, trustee of The Brookings Institution
Andrew Kuper Founder and CEO of LeapFrog Investments
Raymond Kwok (Jesus), Hong Kong property billionaire
Randy Lerner (Clare), American sports entrepreneur, owner of Cleveland Browns
Edward Lewis (Trinity), founder of Decca Records
Sir David Li (Selwyn), chairman and Chief Executive of the Bank of East Asia
Paddy Lowe (Sidney Sussex), engineering director of the McLaren Formula One racing team
Michael Lynch (Christ's), software and internet entrepreneur; co-founder and Chief Executive of Autonomy Corporation
Lord David Cobbold (King's), proprietor of Knebworth House; founder of the Knebworth Rock Festival
Zia Mody (Selwyn), founding partner of AZB & Partners, India's second-largest law firm
Liam Mooney (Hughes Hall), entrepreneur living in Dubai
Nathan Myhrvold (unknown), former Chief Technology Officer at Microsoft; co-founder of Intellectual Ventures

N–Z

Nigel Newton (Selwyn), founder and Chief Executive of Bloomsbury Publishing Plc
Edwin Nixon (Selwyn), successively managing director, chairman and Chief Executive of IBM [UK], then Chairman of Amersham
Archie Norman (Emmanuel), Chairman of ITV plc and formerly Kingfisher plc and Asda
Christian Purslow (Fitzwilliam), managing director of Liverpool Football Club and Founder of MidOcean Partners private equity firm
Sir Michael Rake (unknown), Chairman of BT Group and formerly director of Barclays, McGraw-Hill and the Financial Reporting Council
Sir Benegal Rama Rau (King's), Governor of the Reserve Bank of India (1949–1957)
John Reece (Queens'), billionaire Chief Finance Officer at Ineos
Sir Harry Ricardo (Trinity), pioneering engine designer, founder of Ricardo plc (1927)
Charles Rolls (Trinity), co-founder of Rolls-Royce, the automobile and aviation company
Anthony Gustav de Rothschild (Trinity), Managing Partner of N M Rothschild & Sons, art collector and race horse breeder
Edmund Leopold de Rothschild (Trinity), Chairman of N M Rothschild & Sons, art collector and noted horticulturalist
Sir Evelyn Robert de Rothschild (Trinity), Chairman of N M Rothschild & Sons and Director of IBM United Kingdom Holdings Limited
Leopold de Rothschild (Trinity), banker, art collector and thoroughbred race horse breeder
Lionel Nathan de Rothschild (Trinity), banker, Conservative politician and creator and manager of Exbury Gardens
Mayer Amschel de Rothschild (Magdalene/Trinity), banker, High Sheriff of Buckinghamshire and race horse owner
Nathan Rothschild, 1st Baron Rothschild (Trinity), Managing Partner of N M Rothschild & Sons and funder of the Suez Canal construction
Victor Rothschild, 3rd Baron Rothschild (Trinity), Chairman of N M Rothschild & Sons and biologist
Walter Rothschild, 2nd Baron Rothschild (Magdalene), banker, Liberal politician and pioneering zoologist
David Sainsbury (King's), Sainsbury's supermarket fortune heir; philanthropist
Sir Robert Sainsbury (Pembroke), Chairman of Sainsbury's supermarket (1967–1969)
Simon Sainsbury (Trinity), Director and Deputy Chairman of Sainsbury's supermarket
Apoorva Shah (Unknown), managing director, Co-Head of M&A Asia ex-Japan, Nomura
Rod Smallwood (Trinity), music entrepreneur, manager of Iron Maiden, co-founder of Sanctuary Records
Martin Sorrell (Christ's), founder of WPP, the world's largest advertising group
John Sperling (King's), for-profit education entrepreneur, founder of the University of Phoenix
Lord Dennis Stevenson (King's), Director of BSkyB (1994–2001), a Chairman of HBOS (1999–)
Stephen B. Streater (Trinity), electronics entrepreneur, founder of Eidos
Roger Tamraz (unknown), international banker and oil industry entrepreneur, Director of Intra Bank
Dorabji Tata (Caius), Indian industrialist and philanthropist, Chairman of the Tata Group
J.R.D Tata (unknown), French-Indian aviator, industrialist, entrepreneur, Chairman of the Tata Group 
 Andy Taylor (Trinity), music entrepreneur, manager of Iron Maiden, co-founder of Sanctuary Records
David Thomson (Trinity), Canada's wealthiest family, Thomson Corp. (information services)
Kenneth Thomson (St John's) & David Thomson (Selwyn), Canada's wealthiest family, Thomson Corp. (information services)
Onyeche Tifase (unknown), MD/CEO of Siemens Nigeria and President of Nigerian-German Chamber of Commerce
Sam Toy (Fitzwilliam), Chairman of Ford Motor Company [UK]
Geoff Travis (Churchill), founder of Rough Trade Records and Rough Trade Music Store
Lord David Triesman (King's), business leader, Labour life peer and disgraced ex-chairman of The FA
Sir John Tusa (Trinity/Wolfson), managing director of the Barbican Arts Centre (1995–2007) and the BBC World Service (1986–1993), Chairman of the Victoria and Albert Museum (2007)
Sir Tim Waterstone (St Catharine's), founder of Waterstone's (1982), the largest specialist bookseller in the UK
Neville Wadia (Trinity), Bombay Industrialist and Philanthropist 
Samuel Whitbread (St John's), early owner of Whitbread & Co Ltd brewing firm, Whig politician
William Henry Whitbread (Trinity), Managing Partner of Whitbread & Co Ltd brewing firm, Whig and Liberal politician
Tony Wilson (Jesus), music and youth culture entrepreneur, founder of Factory Records and owner of The Haçienda nightclub
Daniel Yergin (unknown), founder of Cambridge Energy Research Associates and Pulitzer Prize winner
Xin Zhang (Wolfson), founder and CEO of SOHO China
 Zhang Zetian, (King's) Billionaire, chief fashion adviser at JD.com

The law

Judges and lawyers

Charles Sterling Acolatse, Justice of the Supreme Court of Ghana (1964–1965)
Aitzaz Ahsan (Downing), President of the Supreme Court Bar Association of Pakistan (1990–2007)
Awn Shawkat Al-Khasawneh (Queens'), International Court of Justice judge (2000–)
Mary Arden (Girton), first female High Court judge to be assigned to the Chancery Division; Justice of the Supreme Court of the United Kingdom (2018-2022)
Mirza Hameedullah Beg (Trinity), Chief Justice of the Supreme Court of India (1977–1978)
Chris Bentley (Wolfson), Attorney General of Ontario (2007–)
Sir Louis Blom-Cooper (Fitzwilliam), major lawyer specialising in public law and co-founder of Amnesty International
Lee Bollinger (Clare Hall), US High Court lawyer
Sir Dennis Byron (Fitzwilliam), Chief Justice of the Eastern Caribbean Supreme Court (1996–1999), President of the International Criminal Tribunal for Rwanda (2007–)
Kenneth Clarke (Caius), British Lord Chancellor (2010–)
Paul Clement (Darwin), Attorney General of the United States (2007–)
Sir Edward Coke (Trinity), Chief Justice of the King's Bench (1613-1616), Chief Justice of the Common Pleas (1606-1613), Attorney General for England and Wales (1594-1606), widely regarded as the greatest English jurist of the Elizabethan and Jacobean eras; was influential on early American law
Lawrence Collins, Baron Collins of Mapesbury (Downing), one of the first Justice of the Supreme Court of the United Kingdom (2009-2011); general editor of Dicey & Morris, the standard reference work on conflict of laws, since 1987
Alvin Robert Cornelius (Selwyn), Chief Justice of the Supreme Court of Pakistan (1960–1968)
Professor James Crawford (Jesus), Judge of the International Court of Justice (2015–)
Charles Falconer (Queens'), British Lord Chancellor (2003–2007)
Anthony Gates (Fitzwilliam), Chief Justice of the High Court of Fiji (2007–)
Elizabeth Gloster, judge of the Court of Appeal of England and Wales (2013-2018) and Vice-President of the Civil Division. She was the first female judge of the Commercial Court.
Lord Peter Goldsmith (Caius), Attorney General for England, Wales and Northern Ireland (2001–2007)
Sir Hari Singh Gour (Downing), author of the Indian Penal Code, Member of the Legislative Assembly
Hugh Griffiths, Baron Griffiths (St John's), one of the Lords of Appeal in Ordinary (1985–1993)
Joseph Grimberg, first to be appointed Senior Counsel in Singapore and current Senior Consultant in Drew & Napier, a leading law firm in Singapore
Lady Brenda Hale (Girton/Newnham), the only woman ever to be appointed as one of the Lords of Appeal in Ordinary (2004–2009), then Justice of the Supreme Court of the United Kingdom (2009–), first female Deputy President (2013–2017) and President (2017–) of the Supreme Court of the United Kingdom 
Mohammad Hidayatullah (Trinity), Chief Justice of the Supreme Court of India (1968–1970), first Muslim to attain the post
Rosalyn Higgins (Girton), first female International Court of Justice judge, President (2006–2009)
Patrick Hodge, Lord Hodge (Corpus Christi), Justice of the Supreme Court of the United Kingdom since 2013; Deputy President of the Supreme Court of the United Kingdom since 2020
Yong Pung How (Downing), Chief Justice of Singapore (1990–2006)
Karl Hudson-Phillips (Selwyn), International Criminal Court judge, Trinidad and Tobago legal advisor and politician
Ahmad Mohamed Ibrahim (St John's), Attorney-General of Singapore (1965–1967)
Derry Irvine (Christ's), British Lord Chancellor (1997–2003), mentor of Tony Blair and Cherie Booth
Sir Rupert Jackson (Jesus), Judge of the Court of Appeal of England and Wales (2008–)
Professor Robert Jennings (Downing; Jesus), Judge of the International Court of Justice (1982–1991), later President (1991–1994)
Wee Chong Jin (St John's), first Chief Justice of the Republic of Singapore (1963–1990)
Anthony Julius (Jesus), lawyer in Princess Diana and David Irving cases
David Kitchin, Lord Kitchin (Fitzwilliam), Justice of the Supreme Court of the United Kingdom since 2018
Makhdoom Ali Khan (Corpus Christi), Attorney General of Pakistan (2001–2007)
Susan Kiefel (Wolfson), 13th Chief Justice of Australia (2017–), Kiefel is the first woman to hold that position
Sir Elihu Lauterpacht (Trinity), International Court of Justice lawyer
Sir Hersch Lauterpacht (unknown), Judge of the International Court of Justice (1955–1960), member of the UN's International Law Commission (1952–1954)
George Leggatt, Lord Leggatt (King's), Justice of the Supreme Court of the United Kingdom since 2020
Andrew Li (Fitzwilliam), Chief Justice of Hong Kong (1997–2010)
Wong Yan Lung (Magdalene), Secretary for Justice of Hong Kong
Sir Richard May (Selwyn), major judge, British representative on the UN's International Criminal Tribunal for the former Yugoslavia
Sir Robert Megarry (Trinity Hall), Chancellor of the High Court from 1976 to 1985
Peter Millett, Baron Millett (Trinity Hall), one of the Lords of Appeal in Ordinary from 1998 to 2004
Zia Mody (Selwyn), founding partner of AZB & Partners, India's second-largest law firm
Michael Mustill, Baron Mustill (St John's College), one of the Lords of Appeal in Ordinary from 1992 to 1997
Donald Nicholls, Baron Nicholls of Birkenhead (Trinity Hall), one of the Lords of Appeal in Ordinary from 1994 to 2007
Peter Oliver, Baron Oliver of Aylmerton (Trinity Hall), one of the Lords of Appeal in Ordinary from 1986 to 1991
Chan Seng Onn (Hughes Hall), Justice of the Supreme Court of Singapore (2007–)
Hisashi Owada (Trinity), International Court of Justice judge, Presidefnt (2009–)
Lord Nicholas Phillips (King's), Lord Chief Justice of England and Wales (2005–2008) and President of the Supreme Court of the United Kingdom (2009–)
V. K. Rajah, Attorney-General of Singapore (2014–), former Judge of Appeal of the Supreme Court of Singapore (2007–2014)
Sir Benegal Rama Rau (King's), Vice-chairman of the UN's International Law Commission (1949–1952)
Peter Rawlinson, Baron Rawlinson of Ewell (Christ's), Attorney General for England and Wales
Lord Reid (Jesus), one of the Lords of Appeal in Ordinary (1948–1975)
David Richards, Lord Richards of Camberwell (Trinity), Justice of the Supreme Court of the United Kingdom since 2022
Patricia A. Rowbotham (LL.M. 1984), Justice of the Alberta Court of Appeal, Canada
Vivien Rose (Trinity), Justice of the Supreme Court of the United Kingdom since 2021
Philip Sales, Lord Sales (Churchill), Justice of the Supreme Court of the United Kingdom since 2019
Lord James Scarlett (Trinity) (1769–1844), Judge, Lord Chief Baron of the Exchequer
Sir Peter Singer (Selwyn), Judge of the High Court of Justice of England and Wales (1993–2010)
Sir Peter Smith (Selwyn), Judge of the High Court of Justice of England and Wales 
Sydney Templeman, Baron Templeman (St. John's College), one of the Lords of Appeal in Ordinary from 1982 to 1994
Choo Han Teck (Hughes Hall), Justice of the Supreme Court of Singapore (2003–)
Sir Colman Treacy (Jesus), Judge of the Court of Appeal of England and Wales (2012–)
Lord Roger Toulson (Jesus), Justice of the Supreme Court of the United Kingdom (2013–)
Evan Wallach (Hughes Hall), Judge of the United States Court of Appeals for the Federal Circuit, former judge of the United States Court of International Trade
Robert Walker, Baron Walker of Gestingthorpe (Trinity College), one of the Lords of Appeal in Ordinary (2002-2009); one of the first Justice of the Supreme Court of the United Kingdom (2009-2013)
Walter Woon (St John's), Attorney-General of Singapore (2008–2010)

Legal academics

Gary Chartier (Queens'), US anarchist legal theorist
Lawrence Lessig (Trinity), US cyberlaw expert, founder of the Creative Commons movement, free software advocate

Journalists and media personalities

J. R. Ackerley (Magdalene)
Clive Anderson (Selwyn)
Alistair Appleton (Gonville and Caius)
Neal Ascherson (King's)
Anushka Asthana (St John's)
Sir David Attenborough (Clare)
Baroness Joan Bakewell (Newnham)
Thorold Barker (Trinity)
Martin Bell (King's)
Jasmine Birtles (Christ's)
Chris Blackhurst (Trinity Hall)
Christopher Booker (Corpus Christi)
Bill Buford (King's)
John F. Burns (King's), Pulitzer Prize winner
Sir Humphrey Burton (Fitzwilliam), Emmy Award winner
Caroline Calloway (St Edmund's)
Pat Chapman (Fitzwilliam)
Philip Collins (St John's)
Ted Conover (unknown)
Alistair Cooke (Jesus)
Geoffrey Crowther (Clare)
Tim Davie (Selwyn)
Tamasin Day-Lewis (King's)
Alain de Botton (Caius)
Katie Derham (Magdalene)
Rick Edwards (Pembroke)
Larry Elliott (Fitzwilliam)
Julie Etchingham (Newnham)
Vanessa Feltz (Trinity)
James Forsyth (Jesus)
Sir David Frost (Caius)
Stephen Fry (Queens')
Jonathan Galassi (Christ's)
James K. Galbraith (King's)
George Gale (Peterhouse)
Bamber Gascoigne (Magdalene)
Dermot Gleeson (Fitzwilliam)
Andrew Gowers (Caius)
Damian Grammaticas (Corpus Christi)
Germaine Greer (Newnham)
James Harding (Trinity)
Johann Hari (King's)
Simon Hoggart (King's)
Charlotte Hudson (Fitzwilliam)
Arianna Huffington (Girton)
Konnie Huq (Robinson)
Faisal Islam (Trinity)
Clive James (Pembroke)
Sarah Jarvis (unknown)
Ciaran Jenkins (Fitzwilliam)
Gareth Jones (Trinity)
Spencer Kelly (unknown)
Lewis H. Lapham (Magdalene)
Walter Layton (Trinity)
Emily Maitlis (Queens')
Andrew Marr (Trinity Hall)
Kingsley Martin (Magdalene)
Kevin McCloud (Corpus Christi)
John McPhee (unknown), Pulitzer Prize winner
Baron Charles Moore (Trinity)
Malcolm Muggeridge (Selwyn)
Iain Overton (Downing/Caius)
Jeremy Paxman (St Catharine's)
George Plimpton (King's)
Norman Podhoretz (Clare)
Amol Rajan (Downing)
Andrew Rawnsley (Sidney Sussex)
Dan Roan (Fitzwilliam)
Alan Rusbridger (Magdalene)
Jenni Russell (St Catharine's)
Roxana Saberi (Hughes Hall)
Stephen Sackur (Emmanuel)
John Simpson (Magdalene)
Tim Stanley (Trinity)
Allegra Stratton (Emmanuel)
Zoe Strimpel (Jesus/Wolfson)
Karan Thapar (Pembroke)
Noel Thompson (St Catharine's)
Peter Utley (Corpus Christi)
Carol Vorderman (Sidney Sussex)
Sid Waddell (St John's)
Alan Watkins (Queens')
Colin Welch (Peterhouse)
Richard Whiteley (Christ's), TV presenter
Claudia Winkleman (New Hall)
Sir Peregrine Worsthorne (Peterhouse)

Sportspeople

Olympians

Harold Abrahams (Caius), Olympian gold medallist (sprinter, long jumper)
David Cecil, 6th Marquess of Exeter (Magdalene), Olympian gold Medallist (hurdler)
Stephanie Cook (Peterhouse), Olympic pentathlon gold medalist
James Cracknell (Peterhouse), double Olympic gold medallist
Billy Fiske (Trinity Hall), youngest US Olympic gold medalist (bobsleigh)
Syed Mohammad Hadi (Peterhouse), multi-talented India international
Peter Jacobs, Olympic fencer
Tom James (Trinity Hall), two-time Olympic gold medallist (2008, 2012)
 Paul Klenerman, Olympic sabre fencer
George Nash (St Catherine's), British Olympic bronze medallist (2012)
Philip Noel-Baker, Baron Noel-Baker (King's), Nobel Prize winner (runner)
Emma Pooley (Trinity Hall), Olympic silver medal (2008), world time trial champion (2010)
John Pritchard (Robinson), British Olympic silver medallist (1980)
Tom Ransley (Hughes Hall), world champion and Olympic bronze medallist (2012)
Sidney Swann (Trinity Hall), Olympic gold medallist (1912)
Annabel Vernon (Downing), Olympic silver medallist (2008)
Anna Watkins (Newnham), Olympic gold medallist (2012)
Josh West (Caius), British-American Olympic silver medallist (2008)
Kieran West (Christ's/Pembroke), Olympic gold medallist (2000)
Sarah Winckless (Fitzwilliam), world champion and Olympic bronze medallist (2004)
Deng Yaping (Jesus), Olympic gold medalist and world champion

Backgammon
 Zoe Cunningham, 2010 Ladies World Backgammon Champion and business executive

Bridge
 Sandra Landy (1938-2017), international player for England and for Great Britain; world champion 1981
 Tom Townsend, Britain and England international and writer

Cricketers

Sir George "Gubby" Allen (Trinity), England captain (1936–1948)
Mike Atherton (Downing), England captain (1993–1998), led England in a record 54 Test matches
Giles Baring (Magdalene), first class (1930–1946)
Mark Bott, first class (1986–)
Mike Brearley (St John's), England captain (1977–1981)
Antony Roy Clark (Downing), first class (1981)
John Crawley (Trinity), England international (1994–1999)
Percy de Paravicini (Trinity), first class (1882–1911)
Ted Dexter (Jesus), England captain (1961–1964)
Phil Edmonds (Fitzwilliam), England international (1975–1987)
Tony Lewis (Christ's), England and Glamorgan cricket captain (1955–1974)
Alfred Lyttelton (Trinity), first man to play both cricket and football for England
Peter May (Pembroke), England international (1951–1961)
Derek Pringle (Fitzwilliam), England international (1983–1993)
Ranjitsinhji Vibhaji II (Trinity), First Indian player to play for England (1893-1894)

Footballers

Percy de Paravicini (Trinity), England international (1883–1884)
Arthur Dunn (King's), England international (1883–1892)
Alfred Lyttelton (Trinity), first man to play both cricket and football for England
Steve Palmer (Christ's), English Premier League footballer, most notably at Ipswich Town F.C. (1989-2006)
William Leslie Poole (Cavendish), Father of Uruguayan Football.
John Veitch (unknown), England international (1894)

Mountaineers

E. S. Kennedy (Caius)
George Mallory (Magdalene)

Racing drivers

Oliver Turvey (Fitzwilliam), GP2 driver (2010–)

Racehorse trainers
John Gosden (Emmanuel)

Rowers

Milan Bruncvík (Peterhouse), Czech Olympian
Sir Adrian Cadbury (King's), 1952 Olympian and former Chairman of Cadbury plc
Rebecca Dowbiggin (Emmanuel), British cox
David Jennens (Clare), European Champion and Olympian (1952)
Shane O'Mara (Hughes Hall), American rower
Alistair Potts (Trinity Hall), world champion cox

Rugby footballers

Rob Andrew (St John's), England international (1985–1997)
Logie Bruce Lockhart (St John's), Scotland international (1948–1953)
Eddie Butler (Fitzwilliam), Wales international (1980–1984)
Gavin Hastings (Magdalene), Scotland international (1986–1995)
Damian Hopley (Hughes Hall), England international (1993, 1995)
Liam Mooney (Hughes Hall), Ireland international (1996-2000)
Eric Peters (Hughes Hall), Scotland international (1995-1999)
Martin Purdy (Fitzwilliam), club level (2003–)
Andy Ripley (Hughes Hall), England international (1972-1976)
Mark Robinson (Hughes Hall), New Zealand international (2000-2002)
Chris Sheasby (Hughes Hall), England international (1993, 1996–1997)
Tony Underwood (Hughes Hall), England international (1992-1998)
Dan Vickerman (Hughes Hall), Australia international (2002–2008)
Wavell Wakefield (Pembroke), England international (1920–1927)

Sports administrators

John Veitch (unknown), President of Marylebone Cricket Club (1898)

Explorers

William John Bankes (Trinity), responsible for amassing the largest personal collection of Egyptian artifacts, at the family home Kingston Lacy
Julius Brenchley (unknown), pre-eminent adventurer of the Victorian era
John Brereton (Caius), chronicler of the first European exploration of Cape Cod and its environs
Johann Ludwig Burckhardt (unknown), responsible for rediscovering the ancient ruins of the city of Petra, lost for almost a millennium
Sir Thomas Cavendish (Corpus Christi), first man to intentionally circumnavigate the globe
Walter Butler Cheadle (Caius), explorer of Western Canada, namesake of Cheadle, Alberta
Francis Fletcher (Pembroke), accompanied Sir Francis Drake on his circumnavigation of the world from 1577 to 1580 and kept a written account of it, claiming Elizabeth Island and New Albion for England
Sir Vivian Fuchs (St John's), responsible for the first overland crossing of Antarctica
Kenneth Gandar-Dower (Trinity), led the expedition to Mount Kenya in an attempt to capture the Marozi, piloted one of the first flights to India
Bartholomew Gosnold (unknown), instrumental in founding the Virginia Company, and the Jamestown settlement, the first permanent English/British settlement in the Americas
Thomas Hooker (Emmanuel), founder of the province of Connecticut and the settlement of Hartford
George Mallory (Magdalene), possibly the first man to reach the summit of Mount Everest
John Mason (Peterhouse), responsible for drawing up the first English map of Newfoundland and naming New Hampshire 
St. John Philby (Trinity), leading Arabist and explorer of the Middle East
John Robinson (Corpus Christi), pastor of the Pilgrim Fathers
William Wentworth-FitzWilliam (Trinity), explorer of Western Canada, first "tourist" to travel through the Yellowhead Pass
John Wheelwright (Sidney Sussex), early explorer of New Hampshire, founder of the settlement of Exeter
Roger Williams (Pembroke), founder of Rhode Island, known for attempts to cooperate with Native Americans
Edward Adrian Wilson (Gonville and Caius) who died on the way to the South Pole with Robert Falcon Scott.
John Winthrop (Trinity), founder and first Governor of Massachusetts

See also
List of chancellors of the University of Cambridge
List of vice-chancellors of the University of Cambridge
List of current heads of University of Cambridge colleges

References

 
Members